

142001–142100 

|-bgcolor=#fefefe
| 142001 ||  || — || August 8, 2002 || Palomar || S. F. Hönig || MAS || align=right | 1.1 km || 
|-id=002 bgcolor=#fefefe
| 142002 ||  || — || August 8, 2002 || Palomar || S. F. Hönig || — || align=right data-sort-value="0.81" | 810 m || 
|-id=003 bgcolor=#fefefe
| 142003 ||  || — || August 8, 2002 || Palomar || S. F. Hönig || — || align=right | 1.1 km || 
|-id=004 bgcolor=#fefefe
| 142004 ||  || — || August 8, 2002 || Palomar || S. F. Hönig || — || align=right | 1.6 km || 
|-id=005 bgcolor=#fefefe
| 142005 ||  || — || August 8, 2002 || Palomar || S. F. Hönig || NYS || align=right | 1.2 km || 
|-id=006 bgcolor=#fefefe
| 142006 ||  || — || August 8, 2002 || Palomar || S. F. Hönig || MAS || align=right data-sort-value="0.80" | 800 m || 
|-id=007 bgcolor=#fefefe
| 142007 ||  || — || August 8, 2002 || Palomar || S. F. Hönig || — || align=right | 1.1 km || 
|-id=008 bgcolor=#E9E9E9
| 142008 ||  || — || August 8, 2002 || Palomar || S. F. Hönig || — || align=right | 1.8 km || 
|-id=009 bgcolor=#fefefe
| 142009 ||  || — || August 8, 2002 || Palomar || S. F. Hönig || ERI || align=right | 2.6 km || 
|-id=010 bgcolor=#fefefe
| 142010 ||  || — || August 8, 2002 || Palomar || S. F. Hönig || FLO || align=right | 1.1 km || 
|-id=011 bgcolor=#fefefe
| 142011 ||  || — || August 9, 2002 || Haleakala || A. Lowe || — || align=right | 3.1 km || 
|-id=012 bgcolor=#fefefe
| 142012 ||  || — || August 8, 2002 || Palomar || S. F. Hönig || V || align=right data-sort-value="0.86" | 860 m || 
|-id=013 bgcolor=#fefefe
| 142013 ||  || — || August 8, 2002 || Palomar || NEAT || NYS || align=right data-sort-value="0.95" | 950 m || 
|-id=014 bgcolor=#fefefe
| 142014 Neirinck ||  ||  || August 8, 2002 || Palomar || NEAT || — || align=right | 1.1 km || 
|-id=015 bgcolor=#fefefe
| 142015 ||  || — || August 11, 2002 || Haleakala || NEAT || — || align=right | 1.3 km || 
|-id=016 bgcolor=#E9E9E9
| 142016 ||  || — || August 8, 2002 || Palomar || NEAT || — || align=right | 1.3 km || 
|-id=017 bgcolor=#d6d6d6
| 142017 ||  || — || August 7, 2002 || Palomar || NEAT || — || align=right | 3.8 km || 
|-id=018 bgcolor=#fefefe
| 142018 ||  || — || August 8, 2002 || Palomar || NEAT || — || align=right | 1.1 km || 
|-id=019 bgcolor=#fefefe
| 142019 ||  || — || August 8, 2002 || Palomar || NEAT || V || align=right | 1.00 km || 
|-id=020 bgcolor=#d6d6d6
| 142020 Xinghaishiyan ||  ||  || August 15, 2002 || Palomar || NEAT || KOR || align=right | 2.0 km || 
|-id=021 bgcolor=#fefefe
| 142021 ||  || — || August 16, 2002 || Haleakala || NEAT || ERI || align=right | 2.1 km || 
|-id=022 bgcolor=#fefefe
| 142022 ||  || — || August 16, 2002 || Haleakala || NEAT || — || align=right | 1.2 km || 
|-id=023 bgcolor=#E9E9E9
| 142023 ||  || — || August 16, 2002 || Palomar || NEAT || — || align=right | 1.6 km || 
|-id=024 bgcolor=#fefefe
| 142024 ||  || — || August 16, 2002 || Palomar || NEAT || — || align=right | 1.4 km || 
|-id=025 bgcolor=#E9E9E9
| 142025 ||  || — || August 16, 2002 || Palomar || NEAT || — || align=right | 1.8 km || 
|-id=026 bgcolor=#E9E9E9
| 142026 ||  || — || August 16, 2002 || Palomar || NEAT || — || align=right | 1.8 km || 
|-id=027 bgcolor=#fefefe
| 142027 ||  || — || August 16, 2002 || Palomar || NEAT || — || align=right | 1.3 km || 
|-id=028 bgcolor=#fefefe
| 142028 ||  || — || August 17, 2002 || Anderson Mesa || LONEOS || PHO || align=right | 2.3 km || 
|-id=029 bgcolor=#fefefe
| 142029 ||  || — || August 17, 2002 || Socorro || LINEAR || — || align=right | 2.6 km || 
|-id=030 bgcolor=#FA8072
| 142030 ||  || — || August 17, 2002 || Socorro || LINEAR || — || align=right | 2.4 km || 
|-id=031 bgcolor=#E9E9E9
| 142031 ||  || — || August 20, 2002 || Kvistaberg || UDAS || — || align=right | 1.4 km || 
|-id=032 bgcolor=#fefefe
| 142032 ||  || — || August 16, 2002 || Palomar || NEAT || NYS || align=right | 1.3 km || 
|-id=033 bgcolor=#fefefe
| 142033 ||  || — || August 19, 2002 || Palomar || NEAT || — || align=right | 1.4 km || 
|-id=034 bgcolor=#fefefe
| 142034 ||  || — || August 19, 2002 || Palomar || NEAT || NYS || align=right | 3.3 km || 
|-id=035 bgcolor=#fefefe
| 142035 ||  || — || August 20, 2002 || Palomar || NEAT || FLO || align=right | 1.1 km || 
|-id=036 bgcolor=#fefefe
| 142036 ||  || — || August 26, 2002 || Palomar || NEAT || FLO || align=right | 1.0 km || 
|-id=037 bgcolor=#fefefe
| 142037 ||  || — || August 26, 2002 || Palomar || NEAT || — || align=right | 1.5 km || 
|-id=038 bgcolor=#fefefe
| 142038 ||  || — || August 26, 2002 || Palomar || NEAT || — || align=right | 1.5 km || 
|-id=039 bgcolor=#fefefe
| 142039 ||  || — || August 26, 2002 || Palomar || NEAT || — || align=right | 1.7 km || 
|-id=040 bgcolor=#FFC2E0
| 142040 ||  || — || August 26, 2002 || Socorro || LINEAR || AMO +1km || align=right | 1.2 km || 
|-id=041 bgcolor=#E9E9E9
| 142041 ||  || — || August 21, 2002 || Palomar || NEAT || MIT || align=right | 2.8 km || 
|-id=042 bgcolor=#fefefe
| 142042 ||  || — || August 21, 2002 || Palomar || NEAT || NYS || align=right | 1.1 km || 
|-id=043 bgcolor=#fefefe
| 142043 ||  || — || August 27, 2002 || Socorro || LINEAR || — || align=right | 4.6 km || 
|-id=044 bgcolor=#fefefe
| 142044 ||  || — || August 27, 2002 || Palomar || NEAT || V || align=right data-sort-value="0.87" | 870 m || 
|-id=045 bgcolor=#fefefe
| 142045 ||  || — || August 26, 2002 || Palomar || NEAT || — || align=right | 1.2 km || 
|-id=046 bgcolor=#fefefe
| 142046 ||  || — || August 26, 2002 || Palomar || NEAT || FLO || align=right data-sort-value="0.82" | 820 m || 
|-id=047 bgcolor=#fefefe
| 142047 ||  || — || August 28, 2002 || Palomar || NEAT || — || align=right | 1.4 km || 
|-id=048 bgcolor=#fefefe
| 142048 ||  || — || August 26, 2002 || Palomar || NEAT || NYS || align=right | 1.2 km || 
|-id=049 bgcolor=#fefefe
| 142049 ||  || — || August 28, 2002 || Palomar || NEAT || V || align=right | 1.2 km || 
|-id=050 bgcolor=#fefefe
| 142050 ||  || — || August 28, 2002 || Palomar || NEAT || NYS || align=right | 1.3 km || 
|-id=051 bgcolor=#fefefe
| 142051 ||  || — || August 28, 2002 || Palomar || NEAT || — || align=right | 1.4 km || 
|-id=052 bgcolor=#fefefe
| 142052 ||  || — || August 28, 2002 || Palomar || NEAT || V || align=right | 1.2 km || 
|-id=053 bgcolor=#fefefe
| 142053 ||  || — || August 28, 2002 || Palomar || NEAT || NYS || align=right | 1.1 km || 
|-id=054 bgcolor=#fefefe
| 142054 ||  || — || August 27, 2002 || Palomar || NEAT || CLA || align=right | 2.6 km || 
|-id=055 bgcolor=#fefefe
| 142055 ||  || — || August 28, 2002 || Palomar || NEAT || MAS || align=right | 1.4 km || 
|-id=056 bgcolor=#fefefe
| 142056 ||  || — || August 28, 2002 || Palomar || NEAT || — || align=right | 1.6 km || 
|-id=057 bgcolor=#fefefe
| 142057 ||  || — || August 29, 2002 || Kitt Peak || Spacewatch || — || align=right | 1.0 km || 
|-id=058 bgcolor=#fefefe
| 142058 ||  || — || August 28, 2002 || Palomar || NEAT || MAS || align=right | 1.1 km || 
|-id=059 bgcolor=#fefefe
| 142059 ||  || — || August 29, 2002 || Palomar || NEAT || — || align=right | 1.2 km || 
|-id=060 bgcolor=#fefefe
| 142060 ||  || — || August 29, 2002 || Palomar || NEAT || V || align=right data-sort-value="0.95" | 950 m || 
|-id=061 bgcolor=#fefefe
| 142061 ||  || — || August 29, 2002 || Palomar || NEAT || V || align=right | 1.1 km || 
|-id=062 bgcolor=#fefefe
| 142062 ||  || — || August 29, 2002 || Palomar || NEAT || V || align=right | 1.2 km || 
|-id=063 bgcolor=#fefefe
| 142063 ||  || — || August 29, 2002 || Palomar || NEAT || MAS || align=right | 1.1 km || 
|-id=064 bgcolor=#fefefe
| 142064 ||  || — || August 29, 2002 || Palomar || NEAT || V || align=right | 1.2 km || 
|-id=065 bgcolor=#fefefe
| 142065 ||  || — || August 29, 2002 || Palomar || NEAT || — || align=right data-sort-value="0.97" | 970 m || 
|-id=066 bgcolor=#fefefe
| 142066 ||  || — || August 29, 2002 || Palomar || NEAT || NYS || align=right data-sort-value="0.92" | 920 m || 
|-id=067 bgcolor=#fefefe
| 142067 ||  || — || August 29, 2002 || Palomar || NEAT || — || align=right | 3.2 km || 
|-id=068 bgcolor=#fefefe
| 142068 ||  || — || August 29, 2002 || Palomar || NEAT || NYS || align=right | 1.1 km || 
|-id=069 bgcolor=#fefefe
| 142069 ||  || — || August 30, 2002 || Palomar || NEAT || — || align=right | 3.5 km || 
|-id=070 bgcolor=#fefefe
| 142070 ||  || — || August 28, 2002 || Palomar || NEAT || MAS || align=right | 1.4 km || 
|-id=071 bgcolor=#E9E9E9
| 142071 ||  || — || August 30, 2002 || Kitt Peak || Spacewatch || — || align=right | 2.0 km || 
|-id=072 bgcolor=#fefefe
| 142072 ||  || — || August 30, 2002 || Kitt Peak || Spacewatch || NYS || align=right data-sort-value="0.93" | 930 m || 
|-id=073 bgcolor=#E9E9E9
| 142073 ||  || — || August 29, 2002 || Palomar || NEAT || — || align=right | 1.8 km || 
|-id=074 bgcolor=#fefefe
| 142074 ||  || — || August 29, 2002 || Palomar || NEAT || — || align=right | 1.3 km || 
|-id=075 bgcolor=#fefefe
| 142075 ||  || — || August 30, 2002 || Palomar || NEAT || — || align=right | 1.7 km || 
|-id=076 bgcolor=#fefefe
| 142076 ||  || — || August 30, 2002 || Palomar || NEAT || — || align=right | 1.7 km || 
|-id=077 bgcolor=#fefefe
| 142077 ||  || — || August 30, 2002 || Palomar || NEAT || V || align=right | 1.2 km || 
|-id=078 bgcolor=#fefefe
| 142078 ||  || — || August 30, 2002 || Palomar || NEAT || — || align=right | 1.5 km || 
|-id=079 bgcolor=#fefefe
| 142079 ||  || — || August 30, 2002 || Palomar || NEAT || V || align=right | 1.3 km || 
|-id=080 bgcolor=#E9E9E9
| 142080 ||  || — || August 30, 2002 || Kitt Peak || Spacewatch || — || align=right | 1.5 km || 
|-id=081 bgcolor=#fefefe
| 142081 ||  || — || August 29, 2002 || Palomar || NEAT || NYS || align=right | 1.1 km || 
|-id=082 bgcolor=#fefefe
| 142082 ||  || — || August 31, 2002 || Socorro || LINEAR || MAS || align=right | 1.2 km || 
|-id=083 bgcolor=#fefefe
| 142083 ||  || — || August 30, 2002 || Anderson Mesa || LONEOS || ERI || align=right | 2.3 km || 
|-id=084 bgcolor=#fefefe
| 142084 Jamesdaniel ||  ||  || August 29, 2002 || Wrightwood || J. W. Young || MAS || align=right | 1.2 km || 
|-id=085 bgcolor=#fefefe
| 142085 ||  || — || August 29, 2002 || Palomar || S. F. Hönig || MAS || align=right data-sort-value="0.88" | 880 m || 
|-id=086 bgcolor=#fefefe
| 142086 ||  || — || August 16, 2002 || Palomar || A. Lowe || — || align=right | 1.5 km || 
|-id=087 bgcolor=#E9E9E9
| 142087 ||  || — || August 16, 2002 || Palomar || A. Lowe || — || align=right | 1.4 km || 
|-id=088 bgcolor=#fefefe
| 142088 ||  || — || August 30, 2002 || Palomar || R. Matson || NYS || align=right data-sort-value="0.95" | 950 m || 
|-id=089 bgcolor=#fefefe
| 142089 ||  || — || August 29, 2002 || Palomar || S. F. Hönig || — || align=right | 1.4 km || 
|-id=090 bgcolor=#d6d6d6
| 142090 ||  || — || August 29, 2002 || Palomar || S. F. Hönig || — || align=right | 3.2 km || 
|-id=091 bgcolor=#fefefe
| 142091 Omerblaes ||  ||  || August 29, 2002 || Palomar || S. F. Hönig || V || align=right | 1.00 km || 
|-id=092 bgcolor=#d6d6d6
| 142092 ||  || — || August 29, 2002 || Palomar || S. F. Hönig || — || align=right | 3.4 km || 
|-id=093 bgcolor=#fefefe
| 142093 ||  || — || August 29, 2002 || Palomar || S. F. Hönig || NYS || align=right data-sort-value="0.91" | 910 m || 
|-id=094 bgcolor=#fefefe
| 142094 ||  || — || August 29, 2002 || Palomar || S. F. Hönig || — || align=right | 1.3 km || 
|-id=095 bgcolor=#fefefe
| 142095 ||  || — || August 18, 2002 || Palomar || NEAT || V || align=right data-sort-value="0.95" | 950 m || 
|-id=096 bgcolor=#fefefe
| 142096 ||  || — || August 26, 2002 || Palomar || NEAT || — || align=right | 1.2 km || 
|-id=097 bgcolor=#fefefe
| 142097 ||  || — || August 29, 2002 || Palomar || NEAT || — || align=right | 1.9 km || 
|-id=098 bgcolor=#fefefe
| 142098 ||  || — || August 17, 2002 || Palomar || NEAT || NYS || align=right | 2.6 km || 
|-id=099 bgcolor=#d6d6d6
| 142099 ||  || — || August 30, 2002 || Palomar || NEAT || KOR || align=right | 2.2 km || 
|-id=100 bgcolor=#fefefe
| 142100 ||  || — || August 29, 2002 || Palomar || NEAT || MAS || align=right data-sort-value="0.82" | 820 m || 
|}

142101–142200 

|-bgcolor=#fefefe
| 142101 ||  || — || August 18, 2002 || Palomar || NEAT || FLO || align=right | 1.0 km || 
|-id=102 bgcolor=#fefefe
| 142102 ||  || — || August 18, 2002 || Palomar || NEAT || — || align=right | 1.2 km || 
|-id=103 bgcolor=#fefefe
| 142103 ||  || — || August 18, 2002 || Palomar || NEAT || NYS || align=right data-sort-value="0.78" | 780 m || 
|-id=104 bgcolor=#fefefe
| 142104 ||  || — || August 30, 2002 || Palomar || NEAT || NYS || align=right data-sort-value="0.85" | 850 m || 
|-id=105 bgcolor=#fefefe
| 142105 ||  || — || August 19, 2002 || Palomar || NEAT || — || align=right | 1.2 km || 
|-id=106 bgcolor=#fefefe
| 142106 Nengshun ||  ||  || August 30, 2002 || Nanchuan || Q.-z. Ye || V || align=right | 1.1 km || 
|-id=107 bgcolor=#fefefe
| 142107 ||  || — || August 17, 2002 || Palomar || NEAT || — || align=right | 1.1 km || 
|-id=108 bgcolor=#d6d6d6
| 142108 ||  || — || August 17, 2002 || Palomar || NEAT || — || align=right | 4.3 km || 
|-id=109 bgcolor=#fefefe
| 142109 ||  || — || August 18, 2002 || Palomar || NEAT || MAS || align=right | 1.2 km || 
|-id=110 bgcolor=#fefefe
| 142110 || 2002 RO || — || September 2, 2002 || Ondřejov || P. Kušnirák, P. Pravec || — || align=right | 1.5 km || 
|-id=111 bgcolor=#E9E9E9
| 142111 ||  || — || September 4, 2002 || Anderson Mesa || LONEOS || — || align=right | 1.9 km || 
|-id=112 bgcolor=#fefefe
| 142112 ||  || — || September 4, 2002 || Anderson Mesa || LONEOS || MAS || align=right | 1.4 km || 
|-id=113 bgcolor=#fefefe
| 142113 ||  || — || September 1, 2002 || Haleakala || NEAT || NYS || align=right data-sort-value="0.92" | 920 m || 
|-id=114 bgcolor=#fefefe
| 142114 ||  || — || September 2, 2002 || Haleakala || NEAT || — || align=right | 1.6 km || 
|-id=115 bgcolor=#fefefe
| 142115 ||  || — || September 3, 2002 || Palomar || NEAT || — || align=right | 1.6 km || 
|-id=116 bgcolor=#E9E9E9
| 142116 ||  || — || September 3, 2002 || Palomar || NEAT || — || align=right | 2.7 km || 
|-id=117 bgcolor=#fefefe
| 142117 ||  || — || September 1, 2002 || Anderson Mesa || LONEOS || MAS || align=right | 1.5 km || 
|-id=118 bgcolor=#fefefe
| 142118 ||  || — || September 1, 2002 || Haleakala || NEAT || V || align=right | 1.1 km || 
|-id=119 bgcolor=#E9E9E9
| 142119 ||  || — || September 2, 2002 || Kitt Peak || Spacewatch || — || align=right | 1.2 km || 
|-id=120 bgcolor=#fefefe
| 142120 ||  || — || September 3, 2002 || Haleakala || NEAT || NYS || align=right | 1.1 km || 
|-id=121 bgcolor=#E9E9E9
| 142121 ||  || — || September 3, 2002 || Haleakala || NEAT || — || align=right | 2.9 km || 
|-id=122 bgcolor=#E9E9E9
| 142122 ||  || — || September 3, 2002 || Haleakala || NEAT || — || align=right | 1.7 km || 
|-id=123 bgcolor=#fefefe
| 142123 ||  || — || September 4, 2002 || Palomar || NEAT || — || align=right | 1.3 km || 
|-id=124 bgcolor=#fefefe
| 142124 ||  || — || September 4, 2002 || Palomar || NEAT || NYS || align=right | 1.2 km || 
|-id=125 bgcolor=#fefefe
| 142125 ||  || — || September 4, 2002 || Palomar || NEAT || V || align=right | 1.2 km || 
|-id=126 bgcolor=#fefefe
| 142126 ||  || — || September 4, 2002 || Palomar || NEAT || NYS || align=right data-sort-value="0.87" | 870 m || 
|-id=127 bgcolor=#E9E9E9
| 142127 ||  || — || September 4, 2002 || Palomar || NEAT || — || align=right | 1.5 km || 
|-id=128 bgcolor=#fefefe
| 142128 ||  || — || September 4, 2002 || Palomar || NEAT || — || align=right | 1.6 km || 
|-id=129 bgcolor=#E9E9E9
| 142129 ||  || — || September 4, 2002 || Palomar || NEAT || — || align=right | 1.8 km || 
|-id=130 bgcolor=#fefefe
| 142130 ||  || — || September 4, 2002 || Anderson Mesa || LONEOS || — || align=right | 1.8 km || 
|-id=131 bgcolor=#fefefe
| 142131 ||  || — || September 4, 2002 || Anderson Mesa || LONEOS || NYS || align=right | 1.4 km || 
|-id=132 bgcolor=#fefefe
| 142132 ||  || — || September 4, 2002 || Anderson Mesa || LONEOS || V || align=right | 1.2 km || 
|-id=133 bgcolor=#E9E9E9
| 142133 ||  || — || September 4, 2002 || Anderson Mesa || LONEOS || — || align=right | 1.2 km || 
|-id=134 bgcolor=#fefefe
| 142134 ||  || — || September 4, 2002 || Anderson Mesa || LONEOS || MAS || align=right | 1.2 km || 
|-id=135 bgcolor=#fefefe
| 142135 ||  || — || September 4, 2002 || Anderson Mesa || LONEOS || — || align=right | 1.8 km || 
|-id=136 bgcolor=#E9E9E9
| 142136 ||  || — || September 4, 2002 || Anderson Mesa || LONEOS || — || align=right | 1.4 km || 
|-id=137 bgcolor=#fefefe
| 142137 ||  || — || September 4, 2002 || Anderson Mesa || LONEOS || V || align=right | 1.2 km || 
|-id=138 bgcolor=#fefefe
| 142138 ||  || — || September 4, 2002 || Anderson Mesa || LONEOS || — || align=right | 1.0 km || 
|-id=139 bgcolor=#fefefe
| 142139 ||  || — || September 4, 2002 || Anderson Mesa || LONEOS || — || align=right | 1.3 km || 
|-id=140 bgcolor=#fefefe
| 142140 ||  || — || September 4, 2002 || Anderson Mesa || LONEOS || NYS || align=right | 1.0 km || 
|-id=141 bgcolor=#fefefe
| 142141 ||  || — || September 4, 2002 || Anderson Mesa || LONEOS || — || align=right | 1.2 km || 
|-id=142 bgcolor=#fefefe
| 142142 ||  || — || September 4, 2002 || Anderson Mesa || LONEOS || — || align=right | 1.7 km || 
|-id=143 bgcolor=#fefefe
| 142143 ||  || — || September 4, 2002 || Anderson Mesa || LONEOS || MAS || align=right | 1.3 km || 
|-id=144 bgcolor=#E9E9E9
| 142144 ||  || — || September 4, 2002 || Anderson Mesa || LONEOS || — || align=right | 1.3 km || 
|-id=145 bgcolor=#fefefe
| 142145 ||  || — || September 4, 2002 || Anderson Mesa || LONEOS || V || align=right | 1.3 km || 
|-id=146 bgcolor=#E9E9E9
| 142146 ||  || — || September 4, 2002 || Anderson Mesa || LONEOS || — || align=right | 2.6 km || 
|-id=147 bgcolor=#fefefe
| 142147 ||  || — || September 4, 2002 || Anderson Mesa || LONEOS || NYS || align=right | 1.2 km || 
|-id=148 bgcolor=#E9E9E9
| 142148 ||  || — || September 4, 2002 || Anderson Mesa || LONEOS || — || align=right | 2.5 km || 
|-id=149 bgcolor=#fefefe
| 142149 ||  || — || September 4, 2002 || Anderson Mesa || LONEOS || — || align=right | 1.3 km || 
|-id=150 bgcolor=#fefefe
| 142150 ||  || — || September 4, 2002 || Anderson Mesa || LONEOS || MAS || align=right | 1.6 km || 
|-id=151 bgcolor=#fefefe
| 142151 ||  || — || September 4, 2002 || Anderson Mesa || LONEOS || — || align=right | 1.2 km || 
|-id=152 bgcolor=#E9E9E9
| 142152 ||  || — || September 4, 2002 || Anderson Mesa || LONEOS || — || align=right | 1.6 km || 
|-id=153 bgcolor=#fefefe
| 142153 ||  || — || September 4, 2002 || Anderson Mesa || LONEOS || V || align=right | 1.5 km || 
|-id=154 bgcolor=#fefefe
| 142154 ||  || — || September 5, 2002 || Ondřejov || P. Kušnirák, P. Pravec || NYS || align=right | 1.1 km || 
|-id=155 bgcolor=#E9E9E9
| 142155 ||  || — || September 6, 2002 || Emerald Lane || L. Ball || — || align=right | 1.9 km || 
|-id=156 bgcolor=#fefefe
| 142156 ||  || — || September 4, 2002 || Anderson Mesa || LONEOS || V || align=right | 1.2 km || 
|-id=157 bgcolor=#fefefe
| 142157 ||  || — || September 4, 2002 || Anderson Mesa || LONEOS || V || align=right | 1.3 km || 
|-id=158 bgcolor=#fefefe
| 142158 ||  || — || September 4, 2002 || Anderson Mesa || LONEOS || — || align=right | 1.1 km || 
|-id=159 bgcolor=#E9E9E9
| 142159 ||  || — || September 4, 2002 || Anderson Mesa || LONEOS || — || align=right | 1.9 km || 
|-id=160 bgcolor=#fefefe
| 142160 ||  || — || September 4, 2002 || Anderson Mesa || LONEOS || V || align=right | 1.2 km || 
|-id=161 bgcolor=#E9E9E9
| 142161 ||  || — || September 4, 2002 || Anderson Mesa || LONEOS || — || align=right | 1.9 km || 
|-id=162 bgcolor=#E9E9E9
| 142162 ||  || — || September 4, 2002 || Anderson Mesa || LONEOS || — || align=right | 2.5 km || 
|-id=163 bgcolor=#fefefe
| 142163 ||  || — || September 4, 2002 || Anderson Mesa || LONEOS || — || align=right | 1.4 km || 
|-id=164 bgcolor=#fefefe
| 142164 ||  || — || September 4, 2002 || Anderson Mesa || LONEOS || V || align=right | 1.3 km || 
|-id=165 bgcolor=#fefefe
| 142165 ||  || — || September 4, 2002 || Anderson Mesa || LONEOS || V || align=right | 1.1 km || 
|-id=166 bgcolor=#fefefe
| 142166 ||  || — || September 4, 2002 || Anderson Mesa || LONEOS || NYS || align=right | 1.3 km || 
|-id=167 bgcolor=#fefefe
| 142167 ||  || — || September 4, 2002 || Anderson Mesa || LONEOS || — || align=right | 2.0 km || 
|-id=168 bgcolor=#fefefe
| 142168 ||  || — || September 4, 2002 || Anderson Mesa || LONEOS || — || align=right | 1.7 km || 
|-id=169 bgcolor=#E9E9E9
| 142169 ||  || — || September 5, 2002 || Anderson Mesa || LONEOS || GER || align=right | 2.4 km || 
|-id=170 bgcolor=#fefefe
| 142170 ||  || — || September 5, 2002 || Socorro || LINEAR || — || align=right | 1.5 km || 
|-id=171 bgcolor=#fefefe
| 142171 ||  || — || September 5, 2002 || Socorro || LINEAR || — || align=right | 1.3 km || 
|-id=172 bgcolor=#fefefe
| 142172 ||  || — || September 5, 2002 || Socorro || LINEAR || NYS || align=right | 1.6 km || 
|-id=173 bgcolor=#fefefe
| 142173 ||  || — || September 5, 2002 || Socorro || LINEAR || — || align=right | 1.9 km || 
|-id=174 bgcolor=#fefefe
| 142174 ||  || — || September 5, 2002 || Socorro || LINEAR || MAS || align=right | 1.1 km || 
|-id=175 bgcolor=#fefefe
| 142175 ||  || — || September 5, 2002 || Socorro || LINEAR || NYS || align=right | 1.2 km || 
|-id=176 bgcolor=#d6d6d6
| 142176 ||  || — || September 5, 2002 || Socorro || LINEAR || — || align=right | 5.2 km || 
|-id=177 bgcolor=#d6d6d6
| 142177 ||  || — || September 5, 2002 || Socorro || LINEAR || — || align=right | 4.3 km || 
|-id=178 bgcolor=#E9E9E9
| 142178 ||  || — || September 5, 2002 || Socorro || LINEAR || — || align=right | 1.5 km || 
|-id=179 bgcolor=#fefefe
| 142179 ||  || — || September 5, 2002 || Socorro || LINEAR || NYS || align=right | 1.5 km || 
|-id=180 bgcolor=#fefefe
| 142180 ||  || — || September 5, 2002 || Socorro || LINEAR || V || align=right | 1.1 km || 
|-id=181 bgcolor=#fefefe
| 142181 ||  || — || September 5, 2002 || Socorro || LINEAR || NYS || align=right | 1.4 km || 
|-id=182 bgcolor=#fefefe
| 142182 ||  || — || September 5, 2002 || Socorro || LINEAR || — || align=right | 1.3 km || 
|-id=183 bgcolor=#fefefe
| 142183 ||  || — || September 5, 2002 || Socorro || LINEAR || MAS || align=right | 1.6 km || 
|-id=184 bgcolor=#fefefe
| 142184 ||  || — || September 5, 2002 || Socorro || LINEAR || V || align=right | 1.3 km || 
|-id=185 bgcolor=#fefefe
| 142185 ||  || — || September 5, 2002 || Socorro || LINEAR || NYS || align=right | 4.1 km || 
|-id=186 bgcolor=#fefefe
| 142186 ||  || — || September 5, 2002 || Socorro || LINEAR || FLO || align=right | 1.3 km || 
|-id=187 bgcolor=#fefefe
| 142187 ||  || — || September 5, 2002 || Socorro || LINEAR || MAS || align=right | 1.3 km || 
|-id=188 bgcolor=#fefefe
| 142188 ||  || — || September 5, 2002 || Socorro || LINEAR || MAS || align=right | 1.6 km || 
|-id=189 bgcolor=#fefefe
| 142189 ||  || — || September 5, 2002 || Socorro || LINEAR || NYS || align=right | 1.5 km || 
|-id=190 bgcolor=#fefefe
| 142190 ||  || — || September 5, 2002 || Socorro || LINEAR || — || align=right | 1.8 km || 
|-id=191 bgcolor=#fefefe
| 142191 ||  || — || September 5, 2002 || Socorro || LINEAR || NYS || align=right | 1.2 km || 
|-id=192 bgcolor=#E9E9E9
| 142192 ||  || — || September 5, 2002 || Socorro || LINEAR || — || align=right | 2.6 km || 
|-id=193 bgcolor=#fefefe
| 142193 ||  || — || September 5, 2002 || Anderson Mesa || LONEOS || MAS || align=right data-sort-value="0.97" | 970 m || 
|-id=194 bgcolor=#fefefe
| 142194 ||  || — || September 5, 2002 || Socorro || LINEAR || — || align=right | 1.8 km || 
|-id=195 bgcolor=#fefefe
| 142195 ||  || — || September 5, 2002 || Socorro || LINEAR || V || align=right | 1.1 km || 
|-id=196 bgcolor=#fefefe
| 142196 ||  || — || September 5, 2002 || Socorro || LINEAR || — || align=right | 1.2 km || 
|-id=197 bgcolor=#fefefe
| 142197 ||  || — || September 5, 2002 || Anderson Mesa || LONEOS || — || align=right | 1.0 km || 
|-id=198 bgcolor=#fefefe
| 142198 ||  || — || September 5, 2002 || Anderson Mesa || LONEOS || V || align=right | 1.3 km || 
|-id=199 bgcolor=#E9E9E9
| 142199 ||  || — || September 5, 2002 || Anderson Mesa || LONEOS || — || align=right | 2.6 km || 
|-id=200 bgcolor=#fefefe
| 142200 ||  || — || September 5, 2002 || Anderson Mesa || LONEOS || — || align=right | 1.4 km || 
|}

142201–142300 

|-bgcolor=#E9E9E9
| 142201 ||  || — || September 5, 2002 || Anderson Mesa || LONEOS || — || align=right | 1.9 km || 
|-id=202 bgcolor=#fefefe
| 142202 ||  || — || September 5, 2002 || Anderson Mesa || LONEOS || — || align=right | 1.3 km || 
|-id=203 bgcolor=#fefefe
| 142203 ||  || — || September 5, 2002 || Anderson Mesa || LONEOS || — || align=right | 1.5 km || 
|-id=204 bgcolor=#fefefe
| 142204 ||  || — || September 5, 2002 || Anderson Mesa || LONEOS || V || align=right | 1.3 km || 
|-id=205 bgcolor=#E9E9E9
| 142205 ||  || — || September 5, 2002 || Anderson Mesa || LONEOS || — || align=right | 1.7 km || 
|-id=206 bgcolor=#E9E9E9
| 142206 ||  || — || September 5, 2002 || Socorro || LINEAR || JUN || align=right | 1.9 km || 
|-id=207 bgcolor=#fefefe
| 142207 ||  || — || September 5, 2002 || Socorro || LINEAR || V || align=right | 1.3 km || 
|-id=208 bgcolor=#E9E9E9
| 142208 ||  || — || September 5, 2002 || Socorro || LINEAR || — || align=right | 1.9 km || 
|-id=209 bgcolor=#E9E9E9
| 142209 ||  || — || September 5, 2002 || Socorro || LINEAR || — || align=right | 1.9 km || 
|-id=210 bgcolor=#E9E9E9
| 142210 ||  || — || September 5, 2002 || Socorro || LINEAR || — || align=right | 1.7 km || 
|-id=211 bgcolor=#fefefe
| 142211 ||  || — || September 5, 2002 || Socorro || LINEAR || V || align=right | 1.6 km || 
|-id=212 bgcolor=#E9E9E9
| 142212 ||  || — || September 5, 2002 || Socorro || LINEAR || — || align=right | 3.3 km || 
|-id=213 bgcolor=#E9E9E9
| 142213 ||  || — || September 5, 2002 || Socorro || LINEAR || — || align=right | 4.8 km || 
|-id=214 bgcolor=#E9E9E9
| 142214 ||  || — || September 5, 2002 || Socorro || LINEAR || EUN || align=right | 2.9 km || 
|-id=215 bgcolor=#fefefe
| 142215 ||  || — || September 4, 2002 || Anderson Mesa || LONEOS || — || align=right | 1.5 km || 
|-id=216 bgcolor=#fefefe
| 142216 ||  || — || September 4, 2002 || Anderson Mesa || LONEOS || — || align=right | 1.3 km || 
|-id=217 bgcolor=#fefefe
| 142217 ||  || — || September 4, 2002 || Palomar || NEAT || — || align=right | 1.6 km || 
|-id=218 bgcolor=#fefefe
| 142218 ||  || — || September 5, 2002 || Socorro || LINEAR || MAS || align=right | 1.4 km || 
|-id=219 bgcolor=#fefefe
| 142219 ||  || — || September 5, 2002 || Socorro || LINEAR || — || align=right | 1.5 km || 
|-id=220 bgcolor=#E9E9E9
| 142220 ||  || — || September 5, 2002 || Socorro || LINEAR || — || align=right | 1.6 km || 
|-id=221 bgcolor=#fefefe
| 142221 ||  || — || September 5, 2002 || Socorro || LINEAR || — || align=right | 1.4 km || 
|-id=222 bgcolor=#fefefe
| 142222 ||  || — || September 5, 2002 || Socorro || LINEAR || NYS || align=right data-sort-value="0.89" | 890 m || 
|-id=223 bgcolor=#fefefe
| 142223 ||  || — || September 5, 2002 || Socorro || LINEAR || — || align=right | 1.2 km || 
|-id=224 bgcolor=#fefefe
| 142224 ||  || — || September 5, 2002 || Socorro || LINEAR || — || align=right | 1.3 km || 
|-id=225 bgcolor=#fefefe
| 142225 ||  || — || September 5, 2002 || Socorro || LINEAR || — || align=right | 1.4 km || 
|-id=226 bgcolor=#fefefe
| 142226 ||  || — || September 5, 2002 || Socorro || LINEAR || — || align=right | 1.8 km || 
|-id=227 bgcolor=#fefefe
| 142227 ||  || — || September 5, 2002 || Socorro || LINEAR || NYS || align=right | 1.2 km || 
|-id=228 bgcolor=#fefefe
| 142228 ||  || — || September 5, 2002 || Socorro || LINEAR || MAS || align=right | 1.6 km || 
|-id=229 bgcolor=#fefefe
| 142229 ||  || — || September 5, 2002 || Socorro || LINEAR || NYS || align=right | 1.0 km || 
|-id=230 bgcolor=#fefefe
| 142230 ||  || — || September 5, 2002 || Socorro || LINEAR || — || align=right | 1.5 km || 
|-id=231 bgcolor=#E9E9E9
| 142231 ||  || — || September 5, 2002 || Socorro || LINEAR || — || align=right | 1.9 km || 
|-id=232 bgcolor=#fefefe
| 142232 ||  || — || September 5, 2002 || Socorro || LINEAR || — || align=right | 1.2 km || 
|-id=233 bgcolor=#fefefe
| 142233 ||  || — || September 5, 2002 || Socorro || LINEAR || NYS || align=right | 1.1 km || 
|-id=234 bgcolor=#E9E9E9
| 142234 ||  || — || September 5, 2002 || Socorro || LINEAR || — || align=right | 2.0 km || 
|-id=235 bgcolor=#fefefe
| 142235 ||  || — || September 5, 2002 || Socorro || LINEAR || MAS || align=right data-sort-value="0.90" | 900 m || 
|-id=236 bgcolor=#fefefe
| 142236 ||  || — || September 5, 2002 || Socorro || LINEAR || — || align=right | 2.0 km || 
|-id=237 bgcolor=#fefefe
| 142237 ||  || — || September 5, 2002 || Socorro || LINEAR || — || align=right | 1.4 km || 
|-id=238 bgcolor=#fefefe
| 142238 ||  || — || September 5, 2002 || Socorro || LINEAR || NYS || align=right | 1.0 km || 
|-id=239 bgcolor=#fefefe
| 142239 ||  || — || September 5, 2002 || Anderson Mesa || LONEOS || — || align=right | 1.8 km || 
|-id=240 bgcolor=#fefefe
| 142240 ||  || — || September 5, 2002 || Socorro || LINEAR || — || align=right | 1.3 km || 
|-id=241 bgcolor=#fefefe
| 142241 ||  || — || September 5, 2002 || Socorro || LINEAR || MAS || align=right | 1.2 km || 
|-id=242 bgcolor=#fefefe
| 142242 ||  || — || September 5, 2002 || Socorro || LINEAR || — || align=right | 1.1 km || 
|-id=243 bgcolor=#d6d6d6
| 142243 ||  || — || September 5, 2002 || Socorro || LINEAR || HYG || align=right | 6.9 km || 
|-id=244 bgcolor=#E9E9E9
| 142244 ||  || — || September 5, 2002 || Socorro || LINEAR || — || align=right | 2.9 km || 
|-id=245 bgcolor=#E9E9E9
| 142245 ||  || — || September 5, 2002 || Socorro || LINEAR || — || align=right | 1.6 km || 
|-id=246 bgcolor=#E9E9E9
| 142246 ||  || — || September 5, 2002 || Socorro || LINEAR || MIT || align=right | 2.5 km || 
|-id=247 bgcolor=#fefefe
| 142247 ||  || — || September 5, 2002 || Socorro || LINEAR || MAS || align=right | 1.5 km || 
|-id=248 bgcolor=#E9E9E9
| 142248 ||  || — || September 5, 2002 || Socorro || LINEAR || — || align=right | 2.3 km || 
|-id=249 bgcolor=#E9E9E9
| 142249 ||  || — || September 5, 2002 || Socorro || LINEAR || — || align=right | 2.2 km || 
|-id=250 bgcolor=#E9E9E9
| 142250 ||  || — || September 5, 2002 || Socorro || LINEAR || — || align=right | 2.3 km || 
|-id=251 bgcolor=#E9E9E9
| 142251 ||  || — || September 5, 2002 || Socorro || LINEAR || — || align=right | 5.6 km || 
|-id=252 bgcolor=#E9E9E9
| 142252 ||  || — || September 5, 2002 || Socorro || LINEAR || — || align=right | 3.5 km || 
|-id=253 bgcolor=#E9E9E9
| 142253 ||  || — || September 5, 2002 || Socorro || LINEAR || — || align=right | 1.8 km || 
|-id=254 bgcolor=#E9E9E9
| 142254 ||  || — || September 5, 2002 || Socorro || LINEAR || — || align=right | 2.9 km || 
|-id=255 bgcolor=#E9E9E9
| 142255 ||  || — || September 5, 2002 || Socorro || LINEAR || — || align=right | 2.9 km || 
|-id=256 bgcolor=#E9E9E9
| 142256 ||  || — || September 5, 2002 || Socorro || LINEAR || — || align=right | 5.7 km || 
|-id=257 bgcolor=#E9E9E9
| 142257 ||  || — || September 5, 2002 || Socorro || LINEAR || — || align=right | 4.9 km || 
|-id=258 bgcolor=#E9E9E9
| 142258 ||  || — || September 5, 2002 || Socorro || LINEAR || GEF || align=right | 2.2 km || 
|-id=259 bgcolor=#E9E9E9
| 142259 ||  || — || September 5, 2002 || Socorro || LINEAR || — || align=right | 3.2 km || 
|-id=260 bgcolor=#E9E9E9
| 142260 ||  || — || September 5, 2002 || Socorro || LINEAR || — || align=right | 1.9 km || 
|-id=261 bgcolor=#E9E9E9
| 142261 ||  || — || September 5, 2002 || Socorro || LINEAR || — || align=right | 2.0 km || 
|-id=262 bgcolor=#E9E9E9
| 142262 ||  || — || September 5, 2002 || Socorro || LINEAR || — || align=right | 2.0 km || 
|-id=263 bgcolor=#fefefe
| 142263 ||  || — || September 5, 2002 || Haleakala || NEAT || MAS || align=right | 1.1 km || 
|-id=264 bgcolor=#fefefe
| 142264 ||  || — || September 5, 2002 || Haleakala || NEAT || NYS || align=right | 1.1 km || 
|-id=265 bgcolor=#E9E9E9
| 142265 ||  || — || September 6, 2002 || Socorro || LINEAR || — || align=right | 2.8 km || 
|-id=266 bgcolor=#E9E9E9
| 142266 ||  || — || September 6, 2002 || Socorro || LINEAR || — || align=right | 2.0 km || 
|-id=267 bgcolor=#fefefe
| 142267 ||  || — || September 5, 2002 || Socorro || LINEAR || ERI || align=right | 2.2 km || 
|-id=268 bgcolor=#fefefe
| 142268 ||  || — || September 5, 2002 || Socorro || LINEAR || — || align=right | 1.6 km || 
|-id=269 bgcolor=#fefefe
| 142269 ||  || — || September 5, 2002 || Socorro || LINEAR || NYS || align=right | 1.2 km || 
|-id=270 bgcolor=#E9E9E9
| 142270 ||  || — || September 5, 2002 || Socorro || LINEAR || — || align=right | 1.5 km || 
|-id=271 bgcolor=#fefefe
| 142271 ||  || — || September 6, 2002 || Socorro || LINEAR || — || align=right | 1.4 km || 
|-id=272 bgcolor=#d6d6d6
| 142272 ||  || — || September 6, 2002 || Socorro || LINEAR || — || align=right | 5.9 km || 
|-id=273 bgcolor=#E9E9E9
| 142273 ||  || — || September 6, 2002 || Socorro || LINEAR || EUN || align=right | 2.6 km || 
|-id=274 bgcolor=#fefefe
| 142274 ||  || — || September 6, 2002 || Socorro || LINEAR || — || align=right | 3.7 km || 
|-id=275 bgcolor=#E9E9E9
| 142275 Simonyi ||  ||  || September 8, 2002 || Piszkéstető || K. Sárneczky || HNS || align=right | 1.7 km || 
|-id=276 bgcolor=#fefefe
| 142276 ||  || — || September 1, 2002 || Palomar || NEAT || — || align=right | 1.5 km || 
|-id=277 bgcolor=#E9E9E9
| 142277 ||  || — || September 6, 2002 || Socorro || LINEAR || — || align=right | 1.8 km || 
|-id=278 bgcolor=#fefefe
| 142278 ||  || — || September 7, 2002 || Socorro || LINEAR || NYS || align=right | 1.3 km || 
|-id=279 bgcolor=#E9E9E9
| 142279 ||  || — || September 7, 2002 || Socorro || LINEAR || ADE || align=right | 4.8 km || 
|-id=280 bgcolor=#E9E9E9
| 142280 ||  || — || September 7, 2002 || Socorro || LINEAR || — || align=right | 2.0 km || 
|-id=281 bgcolor=#E9E9E9
| 142281 ||  || — || September 8, 2002 || Haleakala || NEAT || — || align=right | 1.8 km || 
|-id=282 bgcolor=#fefefe
| 142282 ||  || — || September 10, 2002 || Palomar || NEAT || CIM || align=right | 4.7 km || 
|-id=283 bgcolor=#fefefe
| 142283 ||  || — || September 9, 2002 || Palomar || NEAT || V || align=right | 1.2 km || 
|-id=284 bgcolor=#fefefe
| 142284 ||  || — || September 11, 2002 || Haleakala || NEAT || — || align=right | 1.3 km || 
|-id=285 bgcolor=#fefefe
| 142285 ||  || — || September 10, 2002 || Needville || Needville Obs. || V || align=right | 1.2 km || 
|-id=286 bgcolor=#fefefe
| 142286 ||  || — || September 10, 2002 || Palomar || NEAT || — || align=right | 1.9 km || 
|-id=287 bgcolor=#fefefe
| 142287 ||  || — || September 10, 2002 || Haleakala || NEAT || — || align=right | 1.8 km || 
|-id=288 bgcolor=#fefefe
| 142288 ||  || — || September 11, 2002 || Haleakala || NEAT || — || align=right | 1.6 km || 
|-id=289 bgcolor=#E9E9E9
| 142289 ||  || — || September 12, 2002 || Goodricke-Pigott || R. A. Tucker || EUN || align=right | 1.9 km || 
|-id=290 bgcolor=#E9E9E9
| 142290 ||  || — || September 10, 2002 || Haleakala || NEAT || MIT || align=right | 3.5 km || 
|-id=291 bgcolor=#fefefe
| 142291 Dompfaff ||  ||  || September 12, 2002 || Hoher List || E. W. Elst || — || align=right | 1.1 km || 
|-id=292 bgcolor=#fefefe
| 142292 ||  || — || September 11, 2002 || Palomar || NEAT || V || align=right data-sort-value="0.99" | 990 m || 
|-id=293 bgcolor=#E9E9E9
| 142293 ||  || — || September 11, 2002 || Palomar || NEAT || — || align=right | 1.6 km || 
|-id=294 bgcolor=#fefefe
| 142294 ||  || — || September 11, 2002 || Palomar || NEAT || — || align=right | 2.7 km || 
|-id=295 bgcolor=#fefefe
| 142295 ||  || — || September 11, 2002 || Palomar || NEAT || — || align=right | 1.4 km || 
|-id=296 bgcolor=#fefefe
| 142296 ||  || — || September 11, 2002 || Palomar || NEAT || V || align=right | 1.2 km || 
|-id=297 bgcolor=#fefefe
| 142297 ||  || — || September 11, 2002 || Palomar || NEAT || SUL || align=right | 3.6 km || 
|-id=298 bgcolor=#fefefe
| 142298 ||  || — || September 11, 2002 || Palomar || NEAT || MAS || align=right | 1.3 km || 
|-id=299 bgcolor=#fefefe
| 142299 ||  || — || September 11, 2002 || Palomar || NEAT || — || align=right | 1.2 km || 
|-id=300 bgcolor=#fefefe
| 142300 ||  || — || September 11, 2002 || Haleakala || NEAT || V || align=right | 1.2 km || 
|}

142301–142400 

|-bgcolor=#fefefe
| 142301 ||  || — || September 11, 2002 || Haleakala || NEAT || V || align=right | 1.4 km || 
|-id=302 bgcolor=#fefefe
| 142302 ||  || — || September 11, 2002 || Haleakala || NEAT || — || align=right | 1.8 km || 
|-id=303 bgcolor=#E9E9E9
| 142303 ||  || — || September 13, 2002 || Kitt Peak || Spacewatch || — || align=right | 2.2 km || 
|-id=304 bgcolor=#E9E9E9
| 142304 ||  || — || September 10, 2002 || Haleakala || NEAT || — || align=right | 1.7 km || 
|-id=305 bgcolor=#fefefe
| 142305 ||  || — || September 11, 2002 || Palomar || NEAT || V || align=right | 1.0 km || 
|-id=306 bgcolor=#E9E9E9
| 142306 ||  || — || September 11, 2002 || Palomar || NEAT || — || align=right | 3.0 km || 
|-id=307 bgcolor=#E9E9E9
| 142307 ||  || — || September 11, 2002 || Palomar || NEAT || MIS || align=right | 2.4 km || 
|-id=308 bgcolor=#fefefe
| 142308 ||  || — || September 12, 2002 || Palomar || NEAT || — || align=right | 1.5 km || 
|-id=309 bgcolor=#fefefe
| 142309 ||  || — || September 12, 2002 || Palomar || NEAT || — || align=right | 1.3 km || 
|-id=310 bgcolor=#fefefe
| 142310 ||  || — || September 12, 2002 || Palomar || NEAT || — || align=right | 1.1 km || 
|-id=311 bgcolor=#E9E9E9
| 142311 ||  || — || September 12, 2002 || Palomar || NEAT || — || align=right | 1.6 km || 
|-id=312 bgcolor=#fefefe
| 142312 ||  || — || September 12, 2002 || Palomar || NEAT || — || align=right | 1.2 km || 
|-id=313 bgcolor=#fefefe
| 142313 ||  || — || September 12, 2002 || Palomar || NEAT || NYS || align=right data-sort-value="0.76" | 760 m || 
|-id=314 bgcolor=#fefefe
| 142314 ||  || — || September 13, 2002 || Palomar || NEAT || — || align=right | 1.3 km || 
|-id=315 bgcolor=#fefefe
| 142315 ||  || — || September 13, 2002 || Palomar || NEAT || — || align=right | 1.8 km || 
|-id=316 bgcolor=#fefefe
| 142316 ||  || — || September 13, 2002 || Palomar || NEAT || NYS || align=right data-sort-value="0.79" | 790 m || 
|-id=317 bgcolor=#fefefe
| 142317 ||  || — || September 13, 2002 || Palomar || NEAT || NYS || align=right | 1.4 km || 
|-id=318 bgcolor=#E9E9E9
| 142318 ||  || — || September 13, 2002 || Socorro || LINEAR || — || align=right | 1.4 km || 
|-id=319 bgcolor=#fefefe
| 142319 ||  || — || September 13, 2002 || Palomar || NEAT || NYS || align=right | 1.0 km || 
|-id=320 bgcolor=#E9E9E9
| 142320 ||  || — || September 13, 2002 || Palomar || NEAT || EUN || align=right | 1.8 km || 
|-id=321 bgcolor=#fefefe
| 142321 ||  || — || September 13, 2002 || Socorro || LINEAR || — || align=right | 2.3 km || 
|-id=322 bgcolor=#fefefe
| 142322 ||  || — || September 13, 2002 || Kitt Peak || Spacewatch || — || align=right data-sort-value="0.92" | 920 m || 
|-id=323 bgcolor=#fefefe
| 142323 ||  || — || September 13, 2002 || Socorro || LINEAR || — || align=right | 1.4 km || 
|-id=324 bgcolor=#fefefe
| 142324 ||  || — || September 13, 2002 || Socorro || LINEAR || — || align=right | 2.2 km || 
|-id=325 bgcolor=#fefefe
| 142325 ||  || — || September 13, 2002 || Palomar || NEAT || FLO || align=right data-sort-value="0.99" | 990 m || 
|-id=326 bgcolor=#fefefe
| 142326 ||  || — || September 13, 2002 || Palomar || NEAT || — || align=right | 1.4 km || 
|-id=327 bgcolor=#E9E9E9
| 142327 ||  || — || September 14, 2002 || Kitt Peak || Spacewatch || — || align=right | 1.4 km || 
|-id=328 bgcolor=#fefefe
| 142328 ||  || — || September 14, 2002 || Palomar || NEAT || NYS || align=right data-sort-value="0.96" | 960 m || 
|-id=329 bgcolor=#E9E9E9
| 142329 ||  || — || September 11, 2002 || Palomar || NEAT || MAR || align=right | 1.4 km || 
|-id=330 bgcolor=#E9E9E9
| 142330 ||  || — || September 12, 2002 || Palomar || NEAT || — || align=right | 1.9 km || 
|-id=331 bgcolor=#fefefe
| 142331 ||  || — || September 12, 2002 || Palomar || NEAT || — || align=right | 1.1 km || 
|-id=332 bgcolor=#fefefe
| 142332 ||  || — || September 13, 2002 || Palomar || NEAT || V || align=right | 1.3 km || 
|-id=333 bgcolor=#fefefe
| 142333 ||  || — || September 12, 2002 || Palomar || NEAT || — || align=right | 1.6 km || 
|-id=334 bgcolor=#fefefe
| 142334 ||  || — || September 14, 2002 || Palomar || NEAT || V || align=right data-sort-value="0.94" | 940 m || 
|-id=335 bgcolor=#fefefe
| 142335 ||  || — || September 14, 2002 || Palomar || NEAT || V || align=right | 1.2 km || 
|-id=336 bgcolor=#fefefe
| 142336 ||  || — || September 14, 2002 || Palomar || NEAT || NYS || align=right data-sort-value="0.91" | 910 m || 
|-id=337 bgcolor=#fefefe
| 142337 ||  || — || September 12, 2002 || Palomar || NEAT || V || align=right | 1.2 km || 
|-id=338 bgcolor=#fefefe
| 142338 ||  || — || September 13, 2002 || Palomar || NEAT || — || align=right data-sort-value="0.88" | 880 m || 
|-id=339 bgcolor=#fefefe
| 142339 ||  || — || September 13, 2002 || Anderson Mesa || LONEOS || V || align=right | 1.3 km || 
|-id=340 bgcolor=#fefefe
| 142340 ||  || — || September 13, 2002 || Palomar || NEAT || — || align=right | 1.9 km || 
|-id=341 bgcolor=#fefefe
| 142341 ||  || — || September 14, 2002 || Palomar || NEAT || V || align=right data-sort-value="0.99" | 990 m || 
|-id=342 bgcolor=#fefefe
| 142342 ||  || — || September 14, 2002 || Palomar || NEAT || V || align=right | 1.1 km || 
|-id=343 bgcolor=#fefefe
| 142343 ||  || — || September 14, 2002 || Palomar || NEAT || NYS || align=right | 1.2 km || 
|-id=344 bgcolor=#fefefe
| 142344 ||  || — || September 14, 2002 || Palomar || NEAT || — || align=right | 1.8 km || 
|-id=345 bgcolor=#E9E9E9
| 142345 ||  || — || September 14, 2002 || Palomar || NEAT || MAR || align=right | 1.5 km || 
|-id=346 bgcolor=#fefefe
| 142346 ||  || — || September 14, 2002 || Palomar || NEAT || MAS || align=right | 1.4 km || 
|-id=347 bgcolor=#fefefe
| 142347 ||  || — || September 13, 2002 || Kitt Peak || Spacewatch || NYS || align=right data-sort-value="0.87" | 870 m || 
|-id=348 bgcolor=#FFC2E0
| 142348 ||  || — || September 9, 2002 || Haleakala || NEAT || AMO +1km || align=right data-sort-value="0.83" | 830 m || 
|-id=349 bgcolor=#E9E9E9
| 142349 ||  || — || September 15, 2002 || Haleakala || NEAT || — || align=right | 3.8 km || 
|-id=350 bgcolor=#fefefe
| 142350 ||  || — || September 12, 2002 || Haleakala || NEAT || V || align=right | 1.2 km || 
|-id=351 bgcolor=#fefefe
| 142351 ||  || — || September 13, 2002 || Anderson Mesa || LONEOS || — || align=right | 2.9 km || 
|-id=352 bgcolor=#fefefe
| 142352 ||  || — || September 13, 2002 || Socorro || LINEAR || — || align=right | 1.3 km || 
|-id=353 bgcolor=#fefefe
| 142353 ||  || — || September 14, 2002 || Palomar || NEAT || — || align=right | 1.1 km || 
|-id=354 bgcolor=#fefefe
| 142354 ||  || — || September 14, 2002 || Palomar || NEAT || — || align=right | 1.1 km || 
|-id=355 bgcolor=#E9E9E9
| 142355 ||  || — || September 14, 2002 || Haleakala || NEAT || — || align=right | 3.2 km || 
|-id=356 bgcolor=#fefefe
| 142356 ||  || — || September 15, 2002 || Palomar || NEAT || NYS || align=right | 1.2 km || 
|-id=357 bgcolor=#fefefe
| 142357 ||  || — || September 15, 2002 || Palomar || NEAT || NYS || align=right | 1.1 km || 
|-id=358 bgcolor=#E9E9E9
| 142358 ||  || — || September 15, 2002 || Palomar || NEAT || — || align=right | 2.1 km || 
|-id=359 bgcolor=#E9E9E9
| 142359 ||  || — || September 13, 2002 || Haleakala || NEAT || — || align=right | 1.6 km || 
|-id=360 bgcolor=#fefefe
| 142360 ||  || — || September 13, 2002 || Palomar || NEAT || V || align=right data-sort-value="0.76" | 760 m || 
|-id=361 bgcolor=#E9E9E9
| 142361 ||  || — || September 13, 2002 || Palomar || NEAT || MAR || align=right | 1.6 km || 
|-id=362 bgcolor=#fefefe
| 142362 ||  || — || September 13, 2002 || Haleakala || NEAT || — || align=right | 1.4 km || 
|-id=363 bgcolor=#fefefe
| 142363 ||  || — || September 14, 2002 || Palomar || NEAT || — || align=right | 1.0 km || 
|-id=364 bgcolor=#fefefe
| 142364 ||  || — || September 14, 2002 || Haleakala || NEAT || V || align=right | 1.4 km || 
|-id=365 bgcolor=#fefefe
| 142365 ||  || — || September 14, 2002 || Haleakala || NEAT || V || align=right | 1.2 km || 
|-id=366 bgcolor=#fefefe
| 142366 ||  || — || September 14, 2002 || Haleakala || NEAT || — || align=right | 1.8 km || 
|-id=367 bgcolor=#fefefe
| 142367 ||  || — || September 14, 2002 || Haleakala || R. Matson || — || align=right | 1.1 km || 
|-id=368 bgcolor=#fefefe
| 142368 Majden ||  ||  || September 14, 2002 || Palomar || R. Matson || — || align=right | 1.4 km || 
|-id=369 bgcolor=#fefefe
| 142369 Johnhodges ||  ||  || September 14, 2002 || Palomar || R. Matson || — || align=right | 1.3 km || 
|-id=370 bgcolor=#fefefe
| 142370 ||  || — || September 15, 2002 || Palomar || S. F. Hönig || EUT || align=right data-sort-value="0.98" | 980 m || 
|-id=371 bgcolor=#fefefe
| 142371 ||  || — || September 8, 2002 || Haleakala || R. Matson || — || align=right | 1.1 km || 
|-id=372 bgcolor=#E9E9E9
| 142372 ||  || — || September 14, 2002 || Palomar || NEAT || — || align=right | 2.0 km || 
|-id=373 bgcolor=#fefefe
| 142373 ||  || — || September 14, 2002 || Palomar || NEAT || NYS || align=right data-sort-value="0.91" | 910 m || 
|-id=374 bgcolor=#fefefe
| 142374 ||  || — || September 14, 2002 || Palomar || NEAT || — || align=right | 1.1 km || 
|-id=375 bgcolor=#fefefe
| 142375 ||  || — || September 9, 2002 || Palomar || NEAT || — || align=right | 1.4 km || 
|-id=376 bgcolor=#fefefe
| 142376 ||  || — || September 14, 2002 || Palomar || NEAT || — || align=right | 1.5 km || 
|-id=377 bgcolor=#fefefe
| 142377 ||  || — || September 13, 2002 || Palomar || NEAT || — || align=right | 1.3 km || 
|-id=378 bgcolor=#E9E9E9
| 142378 ||  || — || September 27, 2002 || Ametlla de Mar || Ametlla de Mar Obs. || — || align=right | 1.5 km || 
|-id=379 bgcolor=#E9E9E9
| 142379 ||  || — || September 26, 2002 || Palomar || NEAT || — || align=right | 1.1 km || 
|-id=380 bgcolor=#E9E9E9
| 142380 ||  || — || September 27, 2002 || Palomar || NEAT || — || align=right | 1.7 km || 
|-id=381 bgcolor=#E9E9E9
| 142381 ||  || — || September 27, 2002 || Palomar || NEAT || MRX || align=right | 2.0 km || 
|-id=382 bgcolor=#E9E9E9
| 142382 ||  || — || September 27, 2002 || Palomar || NEAT || — || align=right | 1.7 km || 
|-id=383 bgcolor=#fefefe
| 142383 ||  || — || September 27, 2002 || Palomar || NEAT || NYS || align=right | 1.1 km || 
|-id=384 bgcolor=#fefefe
| 142384 ||  || — || September 27, 2002 || Palomar || NEAT || — || align=right | 1.5 km || 
|-id=385 bgcolor=#fefefe
| 142385 ||  || — || September 27, 2002 || Palomar || NEAT || NYS || align=right | 1.1 km || 
|-id=386 bgcolor=#E9E9E9
| 142386 ||  || — || September 27, 2002 || Palomar || NEAT || — || align=right | 2.2 km || 
|-id=387 bgcolor=#fefefe
| 142387 ||  || — || September 27, 2002 || Palomar || NEAT || — || align=right | 1.6 km || 
|-id=388 bgcolor=#E9E9E9
| 142388 ||  || — || September 27, 2002 || Palomar || NEAT || — || align=right | 1.6 km || 
|-id=389 bgcolor=#E9E9E9
| 142389 ||  || — || September 27, 2002 || Palomar || NEAT || — || align=right | 1.8 km || 
|-id=390 bgcolor=#E9E9E9
| 142390 ||  || — || September 27, 2002 || Palomar || NEAT || — || align=right | 2.2 km || 
|-id=391 bgcolor=#fefefe
| 142391 ||  || — || September 27, 2002 || Palomar || NEAT || — || align=right | 1.5 km || 
|-id=392 bgcolor=#fefefe
| 142392 ||  || — || September 26, 2002 || Palomar || NEAT || — || align=right | 1.5 km || 
|-id=393 bgcolor=#E9E9E9
| 142393 ||  || — || September 26, 2002 || Palomar || NEAT || — || align=right | 2.3 km || 
|-id=394 bgcolor=#fefefe
| 142394 ||  || — || September 28, 2002 || Haleakala || NEAT || V || align=right | 1.6 km || 
|-id=395 bgcolor=#fefefe
| 142395 ||  || — || September 26, 2002 || Palomar || NEAT || MAS || align=right | 1.0 km || 
|-id=396 bgcolor=#fefefe
| 142396 ||  || — || September 26, 2002 || Palomar || NEAT || MAS || align=right | 1.1 km || 
|-id=397 bgcolor=#E9E9E9
| 142397 ||  || — || September 28, 2002 || Haleakala || NEAT || — || align=right | 1.2 km || 
|-id=398 bgcolor=#E9E9E9
| 142398 ||  || — || September 28, 2002 || Goodricke-Pigott || R. A. Tucker || — || align=right | 2.7 km || 
|-id=399 bgcolor=#E9E9E9
| 142399 ||  || — || September 28, 2002 || Goodricke-Pigott || R. A. Tucker || — || align=right | 2.5 km || 
|-id=400 bgcolor=#fefefe
| 142400 ||  || — || September 26, 2002 || Palomar || NEAT || MAS || align=right | 1.3 km || 
|}

142401–142500 

|-bgcolor=#fefefe
| 142401 ||  || — || September 27, 2002 || Palomar || NEAT || — || align=right | 1.7 km || 
|-id=402 bgcolor=#fefefe
| 142402 ||  || — || September 27, 2002 || Anderson Mesa || LONEOS || V || align=right | 1.1 km || 
|-id=403 bgcolor=#E9E9E9
| 142403 ||  || — || September 28, 2002 || Palomar || NEAT || — || align=right | 1.9 km || 
|-id=404 bgcolor=#fefefe
| 142404 ||  || — || September 28, 2002 || Haleakala || NEAT || — || align=right | 1.8 km || 
|-id=405 bgcolor=#E9E9E9
| 142405 ||  || — || September 28, 2002 || Haleakala || NEAT || — || align=right | 3.5 km || 
|-id=406 bgcolor=#E9E9E9
| 142406 ||  || — || September 28, 2002 || Haleakala || NEAT || — || align=right | 2.0 km || 
|-id=407 bgcolor=#fefefe
| 142407 ||  || — || September 29, 2002 || Haleakala || NEAT || V || align=right | 1.2 km || 
|-id=408 bgcolor=#fefefe
| 142408 Trebur ||  ||  || September 30, 2002 || Michael Adrian || M. Kretlow || — || align=right | 1.6 km || 
|-id=409 bgcolor=#fefefe
| 142409 ||  || — || September 28, 2002 || Palomar || NEAT || NYS || align=right data-sort-value="0.95" | 950 m || 
|-id=410 bgcolor=#E9E9E9
| 142410 ||  || — || September 28, 2002 || Haleakala || NEAT || — || align=right | 2.1 km || 
|-id=411 bgcolor=#fefefe
| 142411 ||  || — || September 28, 2002 || Haleakala || NEAT || — || align=right | 1.5 km || 
|-id=412 bgcolor=#E9E9E9
| 142412 ||  || — || September 28, 2002 || Haleakala || NEAT || — || align=right | 4.0 km || 
|-id=413 bgcolor=#fefefe
| 142413 ||  || — || September 28, 2002 || Haleakala || NEAT || V || align=right | 1.0 km || 
|-id=414 bgcolor=#E9E9E9
| 142414 ||  || — || September 28, 2002 || Haleakala || NEAT || — || align=right | 1.9 km || 
|-id=415 bgcolor=#E9E9E9
| 142415 ||  || — || September 28, 2002 || Haleakala || NEAT || — || align=right | 1.9 km || 
|-id=416 bgcolor=#E9E9E9
| 142416 ||  || — || September 28, 2002 || Haleakala || NEAT || — || align=right | 1.6 km || 
|-id=417 bgcolor=#E9E9E9
| 142417 ||  || — || September 28, 2002 || Haleakala || NEAT || — || align=right | 2.9 km || 
|-id=418 bgcolor=#fefefe
| 142418 ||  || — || September 28, 2002 || Haleakala || NEAT || V || align=right | 1.0 km || 
|-id=419 bgcolor=#fefefe
| 142419 ||  || — || September 29, 2002 || Haleakala || NEAT || V || align=right | 1.2 km || 
|-id=420 bgcolor=#E9E9E9
| 142420 ||  || — || September 29, 2002 || Haleakala || NEAT || — || align=right | 2.9 km || 
|-id=421 bgcolor=#E9E9E9
| 142421 ||  || — || September 29, 2002 || Haleakala || NEAT || EUN || align=right | 2.3 km || 
|-id=422 bgcolor=#E9E9E9
| 142422 ||  || — || September 29, 2002 || Haleakala || NEAT || — || align=right | 2.6 km || 
|-id=423 bgcolor=#E9E9E9
| 142423 ||  || — || September 29, 2002 || Haleakala || NEAT || — || align=right | 1.7 km || 
|-id=424 bgcolor=#fefefe
| 142424 ||  || — || September 29, 2002 || Haleakala || NEAT || — || align=right | 1.4 km || 
|-id=425 bgcolor=#E9E9E9
| 142425 ||  || — || September 29, 2002 || Haleakala || NEAT || ADE || align=right | 3.4 km || 
|-id=426 bgcolor=#E9E9E9
| 142426 ||  || — || September 30, 2002 || Socorro || LINEAR || — || align=right | 2.2 km || 
|-id=427 bgcolor=#fefefe
| 142427 ||  || — || September 30, 2002 || Haleakala || NEAT || V || align=right | 1.6 km || 
|-id=428 bgcolor=#fefefe
| 142428 ||  || — || September 30, 2002 || Haleakala || NEAT || NYS || align=right | 1.1 km || 
|-id=429 bgcolor=#fefefe
| 142429 ||  || — || September 28, 2002 || Haleakala || NEAT || NYS || align=right data-sort-value="0.88" | 880 m || 
|-id=430 bgcolor=#fefefe
| 142430 ||  || — || September 29, 2002 || Haleakala || NEAT || — || align=right | 1.9 km || 
|-id=431 bgcolor=#E9E9E9
| 142431 ||  || — || September 29, 2002 || Haleakala || NEAT || — || align=right | 1.5 km || 
|-id=432 bgcolor=#fefefe
| 142432 ||  || — || September 29, 2002 || Haleakala || NEAT || NYS || align=right | 1.1 km || 
|-id=433 bgcolor=#E9E9E9
| 142433 ||  || — || September 29, 2002 || Haleakala || NEAT || — || align=right | 3.6 km || 
|-id=434 bgcolor=#E9E9E9
| 142434 ||  || — || September 29, 2002 || Haleakala || NEAT || — || align=right | 1.3 km || 
|-id=435 bgcolor=#fefefe
| 142435 ||  || — || September 30, 2002 || Socorro || LINEAR || — || align=right | 1.5 km || 
|-id=436 bgcolor=#E9E9E9
| 142436 ||  || — || September 30, 2002 || Socorro || LINEAR || — || align=right | 2.4 km || 
|-id=437 bgcolor=#E9E9E9
| 142437 ||  || — || September 30, 2002 || Socorro || LINEAR || — || align=right | 1.6 km || 
|-id=438 bgcolor=#E9E9E9
| 142438 ||  || — || September 30, 2002 || Haleakala || NEAT || MAR || align=right | 2.7 km || 
|-id=439 bgcolor=#E9E9E9
| 142439 ||  || — || September 21, 2002 || Palomar || NEAT || — || align=right | 2.4 km || 
|-id=440 bgcolor=#E9E9E9
| 142440 ||  || — || September 30, 2002 || Socorro || LINEAR || — || align=right | 1.5 km || 
|-id=441 bgcolor=#fefefe
| 142441 ||  || — || September 30, 2002 || Socorro || LINEAR || V || align=right | 1.3 km || 
|-id=442 bgcolor=#fefefe
| 142442 ||  || — || September 30, 2002 || Socorro || LINEAR || — || align=right | 1.4 km || 
|-id=443 bgcolor=#E9E9E9
| 142443 ||  || — || September 30, 2002 || Socorro || LINEAR || — || align=right | 2.0 km || 
|-id=444 bgcolor=#fefefe
| 142444 ||  || — || September 30, 2002 || Haleakala || NEAT || — || align=right | 1.5 km || 
|-id=445 bgcolor=#fefefe
| 142445 ||  || — || September 30, 2002 || Socorro || LINEAR || MAS || align=right | 1.0 km || 
|-id=446 bgcolor=#fefefe
| 142446 ||  || — || September 30, 2002 || Socorro || LINEAR || MAS || align=right | 1.2 km || 
|-id=447 bgcolor=#fefefe
| 142447 ||  || — || September 16, 2002 || Haleakala || NEAT || — || align=right | 1.4 km || 
|-id=448 bgcolor=#fefefe
| 142448 ||  || — || September 16, 2002 || Palomar || NEAT || — || align=right | 1.6 km || 
|-id=449 bgcolor=#E9E9E9
| 142449 || 2002 TB || — || October 1, 2002 || Ondřejov || P. Pravec || — || align=right | 3.7 km || 
|-id=450 bgcolor=#fefefe
| 142450 || 2002 TV || — || October 1, 2002 || Anderson Mesa || LONEOS || FLO || align=right | 1.2 km || 
|-id=451 bgcolor=#fefefe
| 142451 ||  || — || October 1, 2002 || Anderson Mesa || LONEOS || — || align=right | 1.1 km || 
|-id=452 bgcolor=#E9E9E9
| 142452 ||  || — || October 1, 2002 || Anderson Mesa || LONEOS || — || align=right | 3.5 km || 
|-id=453 bgcolor=#E9E9E9
| 142453 ||  || — || October 1, 2002 || Anderson Mesa || LONEOS || — || align=right | 2.2 km || 
|-id=454 bgcolor=#E9E9E9
| 142454 ||  || — || October 1, 2002 || Anderson Mesa || LONEOS || — || align=right | 1.6 km || 
|-id=455 bgcolor=#fefefe
| 142455 ||  || — || October 1, 2002 || Anderson Mesa || LONEOS || V || align=right | 1.3 km || 
|-id=456 bgcolor=#E9E9E9
| 142456 ||  || — || October 1, 2002 || Anderson Mesa || LONEOS || — || align=right | 2.7 km || 
|-id=457 bgcolor=#fefefe
| 142457 ||  || — || October 1, 2002 || Socorro || LINEAR || V || align=right | 1.7 km || 
|-id=458 bgcolor=#fefefe
| 142458 ||  || — || October 1, 2002 || Anderson Mesa || LONEOS || NYS || align=right | 1.5 km || 
|-id=459 bgcolor=#E9E9E9
| 142459 ||  || — || October 1, 2002 || Socorro || LINEAR || — || align=right | 1.7 km || 
|-id=460 bgcolor=#E9E9E9
| 142460 ||  || — || October 1, 2002 || Anderson Mesa || LONEOS || — || align=right | 3.0 km || 
|-id=461 bgcolor=#E9E9E9
| 142461 ||  || — || October 1, 2002 || Anderson Mesa || LONEOS || — || align=right | 3.0 km || 
|-id=462 bgcolor=#fefefe
| 142462 ||  || — || October 1, 2002 || Haleakala || NEAT || NYS || align=right | 1.4 km || 
|-id=463 bgcolor=#E9E9E9
| 142463 ||  || — || October 1, 2002 || Haleakala || NEAT || — || align=right | 1.6 km || 
|-id=464 bgcolor=#FFC2E0
| 142464 ||  || — || October 2, 2002 || Socorro || LINEAR || AMO +1km || align=right data-sort-value="0.89" | 890 m || 
|-id=465 bgcolor=#fefefe
| 142465 ||  || — || October 1, 2002 || Anderson Mesa || LONEOS || NYS || align=right | 1.2 km || 
|-id=466 bgcolor=#E9E9E9
| 142466 ||  || — || October 1, 2002 || Socorro || LINEAR || — || align=right | 2.4 km || 
|-id=467 bgcolor=#E9E9E9
| 142467 ||  || — || October 1, 2002 || Anderson Mesa || LONEOS || — || align=right | 2.1 km || 
|-id=468 bgcolor=#fefefe
| 142468 ||  || — || October 1, 2002 || Anderson Mesa || LONEOS || — || align=right | 1.7 km || 
|-id=469 bgcolor=#fefefe
| 142469 ||  || — || October 1, 2002 || Anderson Mesa || LONEOS || — || align=right | 1.6 km || 
|-id=470 bgcolor=#d6d6d6
| 142470 ||  || — || October 1, 2002 || Anderson Mesa || LONEOS || SHU3:2 || align=right | 9.1 km || 
|-id=471 bgcolor=#E9E9E9
| 142471 ||  || — || October 1, 2002 || Anderson Mesa || LONEOS || — || align=right | 1.9 km || 
|-id=472 bgcolor=#E9E9E9
| 142472 ||  || — || October 1, 2002 || Socorro || LINEAR || — || align=right | 1.7 km || 
|-id=473 bgcolor=#E9E9E9
| 142473 ||  || — || October 1, 2002 || Kleť || Kleť Obs. || — || align=right | 2.0 km || 
|-id=474 bgcolor=#fefefe
| 142474 ||  || — || October 2, 2002 || Socorro || LINEAR || — || align=right | 1.4 km || 
|-id=475 bgcolor=#E9E9E9
| 142475 ||  || — || October 2, 2002 || Socorro || LINEAR || — || align=right | 5.1 km || 
|-id=476 bgcolor=#fefefe
| 142476 ||  || — || October 2, 2002 || Socorro || LINEAR || — || align=right | 1.6 km || 
|-id=477 bgcolor=#E9E9E9
| 142477 ||  || — || October 2, 2002 || Socorro || LINEAR || — || align=right | 1.4 km || 
|-id=478 bgcolor=#E9E9E9
| 142478 ||  || — || October 2, 2002 || Socorro || LINEAR || — || align=right | 1.3 km || 
|-id=479 bgcolor=#E9E9E9
| 142479 ||  || — || October 2, 2002 || Socorro || LINEAR || — || align=right | 3.4 km || 
|-id=480 bgcolor=#E9E9E9
| 142480 ||  || — || October 2, 2002 || Socorro || LINEAR || — || align=right | 2.2 km || 
|-id=481 bgcolor=#fefefe
| 142481 ||  || — || October 2, 2002 || Socorro || LINEAR || — || align=right | 1.9 km || 
|-id=482 bgcolor=#fefefe
| 142482 ||  || — || October 2, 2002 || Socorro || LINEAR || V || align=right | 1.1 km || 
|-id=483 bgcolor=#E9E9E9
| 142483 ||  || — || October 2, 2002 || Socorro || LINEAR || — || align=right | 2.7 km || 
|-id=484 bgcolor=#fefefe
| 142484 ||  || — || October 2, 2002 || Socorro || LINEAR || — || align=right | 1.7 km || 
|-id=485 bgcolor=#fefefe
| 142485 ||  || — || October 2, 2002 || Socorro || LINEAR || V || align=right | 1.5 km || 
|-id=486 bgcolor=#E9E9E9
| 142486 ||  || — || October 2, 2002 || Socorro || LINEAR || — || align=right | 1.8 km || 
|-id=487 bgcolor=#d6d6d6
| 142487 ||  || — || October 2, 2002 || Socorro || LINEAR || — || align=right | 4.2 km || 
|-id=488 bgcolor=#fefefe
| 142488 ||  || — || October 2, 2002 || Socorro || LINEAR || — || align=right | 1.2 km || 
|-id=489 bgcolor=#fefefe
| 142489 ||  || — || October 2, 2002 || Socorro || LINEAR || NYS || align=right | 1.4 km || 
|-id=490 bgcolor=#fefefe
| 142490 ||  || — || October 2, 2002 || Socorro || LINEAR || NYS || align=right | 1.3 km || 
|-id=491 bgcolor=#E9E9E9
| 142491 ||  || — || October 2, 2002 || Socorro || LINEAR || — || align=right | 2.5 km || 
|-id=492 bgcolor=#E9E9E9
| 142492 ||  || — || October 2, 2002 || Socorro || LINEAR || — || align=right | 2.1 km || 
|-id=493 bgcolor=#E9E9E9
| 142493 ||  || — || October 2, 2002 || Socorro || LINEAR || — || align=right | 1.8 km || 
|-id=494 bgcolor=#E9E9E9
| 142494 ||  || — || October 2, 2002 || Socorro || LINEAR || — || align=right | 3.0 km || 
|-id=495 bgcolor=#fefefe
| 142495 ||  || — || October 2, 2002 || Socorro || LINEAR || NYS || align=right | 1.2 km || 
|-id=496 bgcolor=#E9E9E9
| 142496 ||  || — || October 2, 2002 || Socorro || LINEAR || — || align=right | 1.9 km || 
|-id=497 bgcolor=#E9E9E9
| 142497 ||  || — || October 2, 2002 || Socorro || LINEAR || — || align=right | 1.7 km || 
|-id=498 bgcolor=#fefefe
| 142498 ||  || — || October 2, 2002 || Socorro || LINEAR || — || align=right | 1.5 km || 
|-id=499 bgcolor=#fefefe
| 142499 ||  || — || October 2, 2002 || Socorro || LINEAR || V || align=right | 1.3 km || 
|-id=500 bgcolor=#fefefe
| 142500 ||  || — || October 2, 2002 || Socorro || LINEAR || FLO || align=right | 1.3 km || 
|}

142501–142600 

|-bgcolor=#E9E9E9
| 142501 ||  || — || October 2, 2002 || Socorro || LINEAR || — || align=right | 1.6 km || 
|-id=502 bgcolor=#E9E9E9
| 142502 ||  || — || October 2, 2002 || Socorro || LINEAR || — || align=right | 1.4 km || 
|-id=503 bgcolor=#E9E9E9
| 142503 ||  || — || October 2, 2002 || Socorro || LINEAR || — || align=right | 2.2 km || 
|-id=504 bgcolor=#E9E9E9
| 142504 ||  || — || October 2, 2002 || Socorro || LINEAR || — || align=right | 3.9 km || 
|-id=505 bgcolor=#E9E9E9
| 142505 ||  || — || October 2, 2002 || Socorro || LINEAR || — || align=right | 1.8 km || 
|-id=506 bgcolor=#E9E9E9
| 142506 ||  || — || October 2, 2002 || Socorro || LINEAR || — || align=right | 4.6 km || 
|-id=507 bgcolor=#E9E9E9
| 142507 ||  || — || October 2, 2002 || Socorro || LINEAR || — || align=right | 3.1 km || 
|-id=508 bgcolor=#E9E9E9
| 142508 ||  || — || October 2, 2002 || Socorro || LINEAR || HNS || align=right | 2.0 km || 
|-id=509 bgcolor=#E9E9E9
| 142509 ||  || — || October 2, 2002 || Socorro || LINEAR || — || align=right | 1.5 km || 
|-id=510 bgcolor=#E9E9E9
| 142510 ||  || — || October 2, 2002 || Socorro || LINEAR || — || align=right | 1.6 km || 
|-id=511 bgcolor=#E9E9E9
| 142511 ||  || — || October 2, 2002 || Socorro || LINEAR || RAF || align=right | 1.5 km || 
|-id=512 bgcolor=#E9E9E9
| 142512 ||  || — || October 2, 2002 || Socorro || LINEAR || RAF || align=right | 2.1 km || 
|-id=513 bgcolor=#E9E9E9
| 142513 ||  || — || October 2, 2002 || Socorro || LINEAR || — || align=right | 4.0 km || 
|-id=514 bgcolor=#E9E9E9
| 142514 ||  || — || October 2, 2002 || Socorro || LINEAR || — || align=right | 2.3 km || 
|-id=515 bgcolor=#E9E9E9
| 142515 ||  || — || October 2, 2002 || Socorro || LINEAR || ADE || align=right | 5.7 km || 
|-id=516 bgcolor=#E9E9E9
| 142516 ||  || — || October 2, 2002 || Socorro || LINEAR || — || align=right | 2.3 km || 
|-id=517 bgcolor=#E9E9E9
| 142517 ||  || — || October 2, 2002 || Socorro || LINEAR || — || align=right | 2.9 km || 
|-id=518 bgcolor=#E9E9E9
| 142518 ||  || — || October 2, 2002 || Socorro || LINEAR || MIT || align=right | 2.7 km || 
|-id=519 bgcolor=#E9E9E9
| 142519 ||  || — || October 2, 2002 || Socorro || LINEAR || — || align=right | 1.6 km || 
|-id=520 bgcolor=#E9E9E9
| 142520 ||  || — || October 2, 2002 || Socorro || LINEAR || — || align=right | 1.5 km || 
|-id=521 bgcolor=#E9E9E9
| 142521 ||  || — || October 2, 2002 || Socorro || LINEAR || — || align=right | 2.4 km || 
|-id=522 bgcolor=#E9E9E9
| 142522 ||  || — || October 2, 2002 || Socorro || LINEAR || — || align=right | 1.8 km || 
|-id=523 bgcolor=#fefefe
| 142523 ||  || — || October 2, 2002 || Socorro || LINEAR || MAS || align=right | 1.1 km || 
|-id=524 bgcolor=#E9E9E9
| 142524 ||  || — || October 2, 2002 || Socorro || LINEAR || — || align=right | 1.5 km || 
|-id=525 bgcolor=#fefefe
| 142525 ||  || — || October 2, 2002 || Socorro || LINEAR || — || align=right | 1.4 km || 
|-id=526 bgcolor=#E9E9E9
| 142526 ||  || — || October 2, 2002 || Socorro || LINEAR || — || align=right | 2.4 km || 
|-id=527 bgcolor=#E9E9E9
| 142527 ||  || — || October 2, 2002 || Socorro || LINEAR || — || align=right | 1.9 km || 
|-id=528 bgcolor=#E9E9E9
| 142528 ||  || — || October 2, 2002 || Socorro || LINEAR || — || align=right | 2.0 km || 
|-id=529 bgcolor=#E9E9E9
| 142529 ||  || — || October 2, 2002 || Socorro || LINEAR || — || align=right | 3.7 km || 
|-id=530 bgcolor=#E9E9E9
| 142530 ||  || — || October 2, 2002 || Socorro || LINEAR || — || align=right | 3.5 km || 
|-id=531 bgcolor=#E9E9E9
| 142531 ||  || — || October 2, 2002 || Socorro || LINEAR || — || align=right | 2.6 km || 
|-id=532 bgcolor=#E9E9E9
| 142532 ||  || — || October 2, 2002 || Socorro || LINEAR || — || align=right | 3.4 km || 
|-id=533 bgcolor=#E9E9E9
| 142533 ||  || — || October 2, 2002 || Socorro || LINEAR || — || align=right | 1.4 km || 
|-id=534 bgcolor=#E9E9E9
| 142534 ||  || — || October 2, 2002 || Socorro || LINEAR || — || align=right | 5.0 km || 
|-id=535 bgcolor=#E9E9E9
| 142535 ||  || — || October 2, 2002 || Socorro || LINEAR || MAR || align=right | 1.9 km || 
|-id=536 bgcolor=#E9E9E9
| 142536 ||  || — || October 2, 2002 || Socorro || LINEAR || — || align=right | 5.0 km || 
|-id=537 bgcolor=#E9E9E9
| 142537 ||  || — || October 2, 2002 || Socorro || LINEAR || MAR || align=right | 2.6 km || 
|-id=538 bgcolor=#E9E9E9
| 142538 ||  || — || October 2, 2002 || Socorro || LINEAR || — || align=right | 2.0 km || 
|-id=539 bgcolor=#E9E9E9
| 142539 ||  || — || October 2, 2002 || Socorro || LINEAR || — || align=right | 2.5 km || 
|-id=540 bgcolor=#E9E9E9
| 142540 ||  || — || October 2, 2002 || Socorro || LINEAR || — || align=right | 3.2 km || 
|-id=541 bgcolor=#E9E9E9
| 142541 ||  || — || October 2, 2002 || Socorro || LINEAR || — || align=right | 2.7 km || 
|-id=542 bgcolor=#E9E9E9
| 142542 ||  || — || October 2, 2002 || Socorro || LINEAR || — || align=right | 1.8 km || 
|-id=543 bgcolor=#E9E9E9
| 142543 ||  || — || October 2, 2002 || Socorro || LINEAR || — || align=right | 2.2 km || 
|-id=544 bgcolor=#E9E9E9
| 142544 ||  || — || October 2, 2002 || Socorro || LINEAR || GEF || align=right | 2.1 km || 
|-id=545 bgcolor=#E9E9E9
| 142545 ||  || — || October 2, 2002 || Socorro || LINEAR || — || align=right | 2.2 km || 
|-id=546 bgcolor=#E9E9E9
| 142546 ||  || — || October 2, 2002 || Socorro || LINEAR || — || align=right | 2.9 km || 
|-id=547 bgcolor=#fefefe
| 142547 ||  || — || October 2, 2002 || Socorro || LINEAR || — || align=right | 1.6 km || 
|-id=548 bgcolor=#fefefe
| 142548 ||  || — || October 2, 2002 || Socorro || LINEAR || — || align=right | 1.5 km || 
|-id=549 bgcolor=#E9E9E9
| 142549 ||  || — || October 2, 2002 || Socorro || LINEAR || BRU || align=right | 5.8 km || 
|-id=550 bgcolor=#E9E9E9
| 142550 ||  || — || October 2, 2002 || Socorro || LINEAR || — || align=right | 1.8 km || 
|-id=551 bgcolor=#E9E9E9
| 142551 ||  || — || October 2, 2002 || Socorro || LINEAR || — || align=right | 3.8 km || 
|-id=552 bgcolor=#E9E9E9
| 142552 ||  || — || October 2, 2002 || Socorro || LINEAR || — || align=right | 2.0 km || 
|-id=553 bgcolor=#E9E9E9
| 142553 ||  || — || October 2, 2002 || Socorro || LINEAR || — || align=right | 2.5 km || 
|-id=554 bgcolor=#E9E9E9
| 142554 ||  || — || October 2, 2002 || Haleakala || NEAT || MAR || align=right | 1.8 km || 
|-id=555 bgcolor=#FFC2E0
| 142555 ||  || — || October 3, 2002 || Socorro || LINEAR || AMO +1km || align=right | 1.9 km || 
|-id=556 bgcolor=#fefefe
| 142556 ||  || — || October 1, 2002 || Anderson Mesa || LONEOS || — || align=right | 1.7 km || 
|-id=557 bgcolor=#E9E9E9
| 142557 ||  || — || October 5, 2002 || Socorro || LINEAR || — || align=right | 3.6 km || 
|-id=558 bgcolor=#fefefe
| 142558 ||  || — || October 3, 2002 || Campo Imperatore || CINEOS || V || align=right | 1.1 km || 
|-id=559 bgcolor=#E9E9E9
| 142559 ||  || — || October 5, 2002 || Fountain Hills || C. W. Juels, P. R. Holvorcem || EUN || align=right | 2.9 km || 
|-id=560 bgcolor=#E9E9E9
| 142560 ||  || — || October 5, 2002 || Socorro || LINEAR || HNS || align=right | 3.5 km || 
|-id=561 bgcolor=#FFC2E0
| 142561 ||  || — || October 8, 2002 || Palomar || NEAT || AMO +1km || align=right data-sort-value="0.83" | 830 m || 
|-id=562 bgcolor=#E9E9E9
| 142562 Graetz ||  ||  || October 10, 2002 || Michael Adrian || M. Kretlow || — || align=right | 1.5 km || 
|-id=563 bgcolor=#FFC2E0
| 142563 ||  || — || October 10, 2002 || Socorro || LINEAR || AMO +1km || align=right data-sort-value="0.86" | 860 m || 
|-id=564 bgcolor=#E9E9E9
| 142564 ||  || — || October 3, 2002 || Palomar || NEAT || EUN || align=right | 2.2 km || 
|-id=565 bgcolor=#E9E9E9
| 142565 ||  || — || October 1, 2002 || Anderson Mesa || LONEOS || — || align=right | 3.6 km || 
|-id=566 bgcolor=#E9E9E9
| 142566 ||  || — || October 1, 2002 || Anderson Mesa || LONEOS || — || align=right | 1.5 km || 
|-id=567 bgcolor=#E9E9E9
| 142567 ||  || — || October 1, 2002 || Socorro || LINEAR || HNS || align=right | 1.9 km || 
|-id=568 bgcolor=#E9E9E9
| 142568 ||  || — || October 1, 2002 || Socorro || LINEAR || — || align=right | 2.8 km || 
|-id=569 bgcolor=#E9E9E9
| 142569 ||  || — || October 1, 2002 || Socorro || LINEAR || — || align=right | 5.3 km || 
|-id=570 bgcolor=#E9E9E9
| 142570 ||  || — || October 1, 2002 || Socorro || LINEAR || — || align=right | 1.7 km || 
|-id=571 bgcolor=#E9E9E9
| 142571 ||  || — || October 1, 2002 || Socorro || LINEAR || — || align=right | 2.7 km || 
|-id=572 bgcolor=#E9E9E9
| 142572 ||  || — || October 1, 2002 || Socorro || LINEAR || WIT || align=right | 2.0 km || 
|-id=573 bgcolor=#E9E9E9
| 142573 ||  || — || October 1, 2002 || Haleakala || NEAT || — || align=right | 2.7 km || 
|-id=574 bgcolor=#fefefe
| 142574 ||  || — || October 2, 2002 || Socorro || LINEAR || — || align=right | 1.8 km || 
|-id=575 bgcolor=#E9E9E9
| 142575 ||  || — || October 2, 2002 || Haleakala || NEAT || GEF || align=right | 2.4 km || 
|-id=576 bgcolor=#fefefe
| 142576 ||  || — || October 2, 2002 || Campo Imperatore || CINEOS || — || align=right | 1.8 km || 
|-id=577 bgcolor=#E9E9E9
| 142577 ||  || — || October 2, 2002 || Campo Imperatore || CINEOS || — || align=right | 1.6 km || 
|-id=578 bgcolor=#E9E9E9
| 142578 ||  || — || October 3, 2002 || Socorro || LINEAR || ADE || align=right | 2.2 km || 
|-id=579 bgcolor=#E9E9E9
| 142579 ||  || — || October 3, 2002 || Palomar || NEAT || — || align=right | 1.9 km || 
|-id=580 bgcolor=#E9E9E9
| 142580 ||  || — || October 3, 2002 || Palomar || NEAT || GEF || align=right | 2.3 km || 
|-id=581 bgcolor=#E9E9E9
| 142581 ||  || — || October 3, 2002 || Palomar || NEAT || HOF || align=right | 3.7 km || 
|-id=582 bgcolor=#E9E9E9
| 142582 ||  || — || October 3, 2002 || Socorro || LINEAR || — || align=right | 2.4 km || 
|-id=583 bgcolor=#E9E9E9
| 142583 ||  || — || October 3, 2002 || Socorro || LINEAR || — || align=right | 4.4 km || 
|-id=584 bgcolor=#E9E9E9
| 142584 ||  || — || October 3, 2002 || Socorro || LINEAR || — || align=right | 5.9 km || 
|-id=585 bgcolor=#E9E9E9
| 142585 ||  || — || October 3, 2002 || Palomar || NEAT || — || align=right | 6.9 km || 
|-id=586 bgcolor=#fefefe
| 142586 ||  || — || October 4, 2002 || Socorro || LINEAR || — || align=right | 1.6 km || 
|-id=587 bgcolor=#E9E9E9
| 142587 ||  || — || October 4, 2002 || Socorro || LINEAR || — || align=right | 2.2 km || 
|-id=588 bgcolor=#E9E9E9
| 142588 ||  || — || October 4, 2002 || Socorro || LINEAR || — || align=right | 2.5 km || 
|-id=589 bgcolor=#E9E9E9
| 142589 ||  || — || October 4, 2002 || Socorro || LINEAR || HEN || align=right | 1.5 km || 
|-id=590 bgcolor=#fefefe
| 142590 ||  || — || October 4, 2002 || Socorro || LINEAR || — || align=right | 1.2 km || 
|-id=591 bgcolor=#d6d6d6
| 142591 ||  || — || October 1, 2002 || Socorro || LINEAR || — || align=right | 5.8 km || 
|-id=592 bgcolor=#fefefe
| 142592 ||  || — || October 1, 2002 || Haleakala || NEAT || — || align=right | 1.6 km || 
|-id=593 bgcolor=#fefefe
| 142593 ||  || — || October 2, 2002 || Haleakala || NEAT || NYS || align=right | 1.1 km || 
|-id=594 bgcolor=#fefefe
| 142594 ||  || — || October 2, 2002 || Haleakala || NEAT || PHO || align=right | 2.5 km || 
|-id=595 bgcolor=#E9E9E9
| 142595 ||  || — || October 2, 2002 || Campo Imperatore || CINEOS || EUN || align=right | 2.3 km || 
|-id=596 bgcolor=#fefefe
| 142596 ||  || — || October 3, 2002 || Socorro || LINEAR || — || align=right | 1.4 km || 
|-id=597 bgcolor=#fefefe
| 142597 ||  || — || October 3, 2002 || Socorro || LINEAR || MAS || align=right | 1.3 km || 
|-id=598 bgcolor=#E9E9E9
| 142598 ||  || — || October 3, 2002 || Palomar || NEAT || MAR || align=right | 2.4 km || 
|-id=599 bgcolor=#E9E9E9
| 142599 ||  || — || October 3, 2002 || Palomar || NEAT || EUN || align=right | 1.9 km || 
|-id=600 bgcolor=#fefefe
| 142600 ||  || — || October 3, 2002 || Palomar || NEAT || — || align=right | 1.9 km || 
|}

142601–142700 

|-bgcolor=#E9E9E9
| 142601 ||  || — || October 3, 2002 || Palomar || NEAT || — || align=right | 2.2 km || 
|-id=602 bgcolor=#fefefe
| 142602 ||  || — || October 3, 2002 || Palomar || NEAT || — || align=right | 1.8 km || 
|-id=603 bgcolor=#E9E9E9
| 142603 ||  || — || October 4, 2002 || Socorro || LINEAR || — || align=right | 5.7 km || 
|-id=604 bgcolor=#fefefe
| 142604 ||  || — || October 4, 2002 || Socorro || LINEAR || — || align=right | 1.4 km || 
|-id=605 bgcolor=#fefefe
| 142605 ||  || — || October 4, 2002 || Palomar || NEAT || V || align=right | 1.3 km || 
|-id=606 bgcolor=#fefefe
| 142606 ||  || — || October 4, 2002 || Socorro || LINEAR || — || align=right | 1.4 km || 
|-id=607 bgcolor=#E9E9E9
| 142607 ||  || — || October 4, 2002 || Palomar || NEAT || ADE || align=right | 5.2 km || 
|-id=608 bgcolor=#E9E9E9
| 142608 ||  || — || October 4, 2002 || Palomar || NEAT || MAR || align=right | 1.8 km || 
|-id=609 bgcolor=#E9E9E9
| 142609 ||  || — || October 4, 2002 || Socorro || LINEAR || — || align=right | 2.7 km || 
|-id=610 bgcolor=#fefefe
| 142610 ||  || — || October 4, 2002 || Socorro || LINEAR || — || align=right | 1.2 km || 
|-id=611 bgcolor=#E9E9E9
| 142611 ||  || — || October 4, 2002 || Anderson Mesa || LONEOS || MAR || align=right | 2.3 km || 
|-id=612 bgcolor=#E9E9E9
| 142612 ||  || — || October 4, 2002 || Anderson Mesa || LONEOS || EUN || align=right | 2.4 km || 
|-id=613 bgcolor=#E9E9E9
| 142613 ||  || — || October 4, 2002 || Anderson Mesa || LONEOS || MIT || align=right | 3.2 km || 
|-id=614 bgcolor=#fefefe
| 142614 ||  || — || October 4, 2002 || Anderson Mesa || LONEOS || — || align=right | 1.6 km || 
|-id=615 bgcolor=#E9E9E9
| 142615 ||  || — || October 4, 2002 || Anderson Mesa || LONEOS || — || align=right | 2.2 km || 
|-id=616 bgcolor=#fefefe
| 142616 ||  || — || October 4, 2002 || Socorro || LINEAR || — || align=right | 1.6 km || 
|-id=617 bgcolor=#E9E9E9
| 142617 ||  || — || October 4, 2002 || Socorro || LINEAR || BRU || align=right | 3.1 km || 
|-id=618 bgcolor=#fefefe
| 142618 ||  || — || October 4, 2002 || Socorro || LINEAR || — || align=right | 1.6 km || 
|-id=619 bgcolor=#fefefe
| 142619 ||  || — || October 4, 2002 || Socorro || LINEAR || — || align=right | 1.6 km || 
|-id=620 bgcolor=#fefefe
| 142620 ||  || — || October 5, 2002 || Socorro || LINEAR || — || align=right | 1.2 km || 
|-id=621 bgcolor=#E9E9E9
| 142621 ||  || — || October 5, 2002 || Palomar || NEAT || — || align=right | 1.9 km || 
|-id=622 bgcolor=#E9E9E9
| 142622 ||  || — || October 5, 2002 || Palomar || NEAT || — || align=right | 2.4 km || 
|-id=623 bgcolor=#E9E9E9
| 142623 ||  || — || October 5, 2002 || Palomar || NEAT || MIT || align=right | 3.9 km || 
|-id=624 bgcolor=#E9E9E9
| 142624 ||  || — || October 5, 2002 || Palomar || NEAT || — || align=right | 3.3 km || 
|-id=625 bgcolor=#E9E9E9
| 142625 ||  || — || October 2, 2002 || Haleakala || NEAT || — || align=right | 2.2 km || 
|-id=626 bgcolor=#E9E9E9
| 142626 ||  || — || October 3, 2002 || Palomar || NEAT || — || align=right | 4.6 km || 
|-id=627 bgcolor=#E9E9E9
| 142627 ||  || — || October 3, 2002 || Palomar || NEAT || EUN || align=right | 2.1 km || 
|-id=628 bgcolor=#E9E9E9
| 142628 ||  || — || October 3, 2002 || Palomar || NEAT || — || align=right | 2.3 km || 
|-id=629 bgcolor=#E9E9E9
| 142629 ||  || — || October 4, 2002 || Socorro || LINEAR || — || align=right | 2.6 km || 
|-id=630 bgcolor=#E9E9E9
| 142630 ||  || — || October 4, 2002 || Socorro || LINEAR || — || align=right | 3.1 km || 
|-id=631 bgcolor=#E9E9E9
| 142631 ||  || — || October 4, 2002 || Anderson Mesa || LONEOS || — || align=right | 2.7 km || 
|-id=632 bgcolor=#E9E9E9
| 142632 ||  || — || October 11, 2002 || Palomar || NEAT || HNS || align=right | 2.5 km || 
|-id=633 bgcolor=#E9E9E9
| 142633 ||  || — || October 11, 2002 || Palomar || NEAT || MIT || align=right | 3.0 km || 
|-id=634 bgcolor=#E9E9E9
| 142634 ||  || — || October 13, 2002 || Palomar || NEAT || — || align=right | 2.4 km || 
|-id=635 bgcolor=#E9E9E9
| 142635 ||  || — || October 14, 2002 || Socorro || LINEAR || MAR || align=right | 3.5 km || 
|-id=636 bgcolor=#E9E9E9
| 142636 ||  || — || October 3, 2002 || Socorro || LINEAR || — || align=right | 2.6 km || 
|-id=637 bgcolor=#fefefe
| 142637 ||  || — || October 4, 2002 || Socorro || LINEAR || NYS || align=right | 1.3 km || 
|-id=638 bgcolor=#fefefe
| 142638 ||  || — || October 4, 2002 || Socorro || LINEAR || — || align=right | 1.5 km || 
|-id=639 bgcolor=#fefefe
| 142639 ||  || — || October 4, 2002 || Socorro || LINEAR || — || align=right | 1.9 km || 
|-id=640 bgcolor=#E9E9E9
| 142640 ||  || — || October 4, 2002 || Socorro || LINEAR || — || align=right | 4.4 km || 
|-id=641 bgcolor=#E9E9E9
| 142641 ||  || — || October 4, 2002 || Socorro || LINEAR || — || align=right | 1.5 km || 
|-id=642 bgcolor=#E9E9E9
| 142642 ||  || — || October 4, 2002 || Socorro || LINEAR || — || align=right | 2.8 km || 
|-id=643 bgcolor=#E9E9E9
| 142643 ||  || — || October 4, 2002 || Socorro || LINEAR || RAF || align=right | 1.6 km || 
|-id=644 bgcolor=#E9E9E9
| 142644 ||  || — || October 4, 2002 || Socorro || LINEAR || RAF || align=right | 1.2 km || 
|-id=645 bgcolor=#E9E9E9
| 142645 ||  || — || October 4, 2002 || Socorro || LINEAR || — || align=right | 2.2 km || 
|-id=646 bgcolor=#E9E9E9
| 142646 ||  || — || October 14, 2002 || Farpoint || G. Hug || — || align=right | 2.8 km || 
|-id=647 bgcolor=#E9E9E9
| 142647 ||  || — || October 14, 2002 || Farpoint || G. Hug || ADE || align=right | 3.6 km || 
|-id=648 bgcolor=#E9E9E9
| 142648 ||  || — || October 1, 2002 || Socorro || LINEAR || — || align=right | 5.3 km || 
|-id=649 bgcolor=#E9E9E9
| 142649 ||  || — || October 5, 2002 || Anderson Mesa || LONEOS || — || align=right | 3.8 km || 
|-id=650 bgcolor=#E9E9E9
| 142650 ||  || — || October 5, 2002 || Anderson Mesa || LONEOS || — || align=right | 1.9 km || 
|-id=651 bgcolor=#E9E9E9
| 142651 ||  || — || October 5, 2002 || Anderson Mesa || LONEOS || — || align=right | 2.1 km || 
|-id=652 bgcolor=#E9E9E9
| 142652 ||  || — || October 4, 2002 || Socorro || LINEAR || — || align=right | 2.3 km || 
|-id=653 bgcolor=#E9E9E9
| 142653 ||  || — || October 4, 2002 || Socorro || LINEAR || — || align=right | 3.2 km || 
|-id=654 bgcolor=#fefefe
| 142654 ||  || — || October 4, 2002 || Socorro || LINEAR || V || align=right | 1.4 km || 
|-id=655 bgcolor=#fefefe
| 142655 ||  || — || October 4, 2002 || Socorro || LINEAR || V || align=right | 1.3 km || 
|-id=656 bgcolor=#E9E9E9
| 142656 ||  || — || October 4, 2002 || Socorro || LINEAR || — || align=right | 1.6 km || 
|-id=657 bgcolor=#fefefe
| 142657 ||  || — || October 4, 2002 || Socorro || LINEAR || — || align=right | 1.3 km || 
|-id=658 bgcolor=#E9E9E9
| 142658 ||  || — || October 4, 2002 || Socorro || LINEAR || MAR || align=right | 2.3 km || 
|-id=659 bgcolor=#E9E9E9
| 142659 ||  || — || October 4, 2002 || Socorro || LINEAR || — || align=right | 1.7 km || 
|-id=660 bgcolor=#E9E9E9
| 142660 ||  || — || October 4, 2002 || Socorro || LINEAR || — || align=right | 3.4 km || 
|-id=661 bgcolor=#E9E9E9
| 142661 ||  || — || October 4, 2002 || Socorro || LINEAR || — || align=right | 5.1 km || 
|-id=662 bgcolor=#fefefe
| 142662 ||  || — || October 4, 2002 || Socorro || LINEAR || — || align=right | 1.4 km || 
|-id=663 bgcolor=#E9E9E9
| 142663 ||  || — || October 6, 2002 || Socorro || LINEAR || ADE || align=right | 3.1 km || 
|-id=664 bgcolor=#E9E9E9
| 142664 ||  || — || October 7, 2002 || Socorro || LINEAR || HEN || align=right | 1.7 km || 
|-id=665 bgcolor=#E9E9E9
| 142665 ||  || — || October 7, 2002 || Haleakala || NEAT || — || align=right | 2.3 km || 
|-id=666 bgcolor=#E9E9E9
| 142666 ||  || — || October 3, 2002 || Socorro || LINEAR || — || align=right | 1.3 km || 
|-id=667 bgcolor=#fefefe
| 142667 ||  || — || October 3, 2002 || Socorro || LINEAR || — || align=right | 1.5 km || 
|-id=668 bgcolor=#fefefe
| 142668 ||  || — || October 4, 2002 || Socorro || LINEAR || — || align=right | 1.4 km || 
|-id=669 bgcolor=#fefefe
| 142669 ||  || — || October 5, 2002 || Socorro || LINEAR || V || align=right | 1.4 km || 
|-id=670 bgcolor=#E9E9E9
| 142670 ||  || — || October 5, 2002 || Socorro || LINEAR || — || align=right | 2.4 km || 
|-id=671 bgcolor=#E9E9E9
| 142671 ||  || — || October 5, 2002 || Socorro || LINEAR || MAR || align=right | 2.3 km || 
|-id=672 bgcolor=#E9E9E9
| 142672 ||  || — || October 5, 2002 || Socorro || LINEAR || — || align=right | 5.0 km || 
|-id=673 bgcolor=#fefefe
| 142673 ||  || — || October 5, 2002 || Palomar || NEAT || — || align=right | 1.5 km || 
|-id=674 bgcolor=#fefefe
| 142674 ||  || — || October 6, 2002 || Socorro || LINEAR || — || align=right | 3.8 km || 
|-id=675 bgcolor=#E9E9E9
| 142675 ||  || — || October 7, 2002 || Socorro || LINEAR || — || align=right | 4.1 km || 
|-id=676 bgcolor=#fefefe
| 142676 ||  || — || October 7, 2002 || Anderson Mesa || LONEOS || NYS || align=right | 1.1 km || 
|-id=677 bgcolor=#E9E9E9
| 142677 ||  || — || October 8, 2002 || Anderson Mesa || LONEOS || — || align=right | 2.0 km || 
|-id=678 bgcolor=#E9E9E9
| 142678 ||  || — || October 8, 2002 || Anderson Mesa || LONEOS || — || align=right | 1.9 km || 
|-id=679 bgcolor=#E9E9E9
| 142679 ||  || — || October 8, 2002 || Anderson Mesa || LONEOS || — || align=right | 1.8 km || 
|-id=680 bgcolor=#E9E9E9
| 142680 ||  || — || October 8, 2002 || Anderson Mesa || LONEOS || — || align=right | 2.8 km || 
|-id=681 bgcolor=#E9E9E9
| 142681 ||  || — || October 7, 2002 || Socorro || LINEAR || HEN || align=right | 1.6 km || 
|-id=682 bgcolor=#E9E9E9
| 142682 ||  || — || October 7, 2002 || Haleakala || NEAT || MAR || align=right | 1.6 km || 
|-id=683 bgcolor=#E9E9E9
| 142683 ||  || — || October 6, 2002 || Socorro || LINEAR || — || align=right | 2.2 km || 
|-id=684 bgcolor=#E9E9E9
| 142684 ||  || — || October 6, 2002 || Socorro || LINEAR || MAR || align=right | 2.3 km || 
|-id=685 bgcolor=#E9E9E9
| 142685 ||  || — || October 6, 2002 || Socorro || LINEAR || — || align=right | 3.7 km || 
|-id=686 bgcolor=#E9E9E9
| 142686 ||  || — || October 6, 2002 || Socorro || LINEAR || — || align=right | 4.0 km || 
|-id=687 bgcolor=#E9E9E9
| 142687 ||  || — || October 6, 2002 || Socorro || LINEAR || — || align=right | 2.1 km || 
|-id=688 bgcolor=#E9E9E9
| 142688 ||  || — || October 7, 2002 || Socorro || LINEAR || — || align=right | 4.7 km || 
|-id=689 bgcolor=#E9E9E9
| 142689 ||  || — || October 9, 2002 || Socorro || LINEAR || JUN || align=right | 5.4 km || 
|-id=690 bgcolor=#E9E9E9
| 142690 ||  || — || October 7, 2002 || Haleakala || NEAT || — || align=right | 1.8 km || 
|-id=691 bgcolor=#E9E9E9
| 142691 ||  || — || October 7, 2002 || Haleakala || NEAT || — || align=right | 2.8 km || 
|-id=692 bgcolor=#E9E9E9
| 142692 ||  || — || October 9, 2002 || Socorro || LINEAR || — || align=right | 2.1 km || 
|-id=693 bgcolor=#E9E9E9
| 142693 ||  || — || October 9, 2002 || Socorro || LINEAR || — || align=right | 1.8 km || 
|-id=694 bgcolor=#E9E9E9
| 142694 ||  || — || October 9, 2002 || Socorro || LINEAR || — || align=right | 1.2 km || 
|-id=695 bgcolor=#E9E9E9
| 142695 ||  || — || October 9, 2002 || Anderson Mesa || LONEOS || — || align=right | 1.9 km || 
|-id=696 bgcolor=#fefefe
| 142696 ||  || — || October 9, 2002 || Socorro || LINEAR || — || align=right | 1.6 km || 
|-id=697 bgcolor=#fefefe
| 142697 ||  || — || October 9, 2002 || Socorro || LINEAR || — || align=right | 1.1 km || 
|-id=698 bgcolor=#fefefe
| 142698 ||  || — || October 7, 2002 || Palomar || NEAT || — || align=right | 1.3 km || 
|-id=699 bgcolor=#fefefe
| 142699 ||  || — || October 8, 2002 || Anderson Mesa || LONEOS || — || align=right | 1.3 km || 
|-id=700 bgcolor=#E9E9E9
| 142700 ||  || — || October 9, 2002 || Anderson Mesa || LONEOS || — || align=right | 4.8 km || 
|}

142701–142800 

|-bgcolor=#E9E9E9
| 142701 ||  || — || October 9, 2002 || Anderson Mesa || LONEOS || — || align=right | 2.2 km || 
|-id=702 bgcolor=#E9E9E9
| 142702 ||  || — || October 9, 2002 || Anderson Mesa || LONEOS || — || align=right | 1.6 km || 
|-id=703 bgcolor=#E9E9E9
| 142703 ||  || — || October 9, 2002 || Socorro || LINEAR || HEN || align=right | 1.7 km || 
|-id=704 bgcolor=#fefefe
| 142704 ||  || — || October 9, 2002 || Socorro || LINEAR || — || align=right | 1.5 km || 
|-id=705 bgcolor=#E9E9E9
| 142705 ||  || — || October 9, 2002 || Socorro || LINEAR || PAD || align=right | 3.1 km || 
|-id=706 bgcolor=#E9E9E9
| 142706 ||  || — || October 9, 2002 || Socorro || LINEAR || — || align=right | 1.8 km || 
|-id=707 bgcolor=#E9E9E9
| 142707 ||  || — || October 9, 2002 || Socorro || LINEAR || — || align=right | 1.3 km || 
|-id=708 bgcolor=#E9E9E9
| 142708 ||  || — || October 9, 2002 || Socorro || LINEAR || — || align=right | 1.4 km || 
|-id=709 bgcolor=#E9E9E9
| 142709 ||  || — || October 9, 2002 || Socorro || LINEAR || JUN || align=right | 1.8 km || 
|-id=710 bgcolor=#E9E9E9
| 142710 ||  || — || October 9, 2002 || Kitt Peak || Spacewatch || — || align=right | 3.5 km || 
|-id=711 bgcolor=#E9E9E9
| 142711 ||  || — || October 10, 2002 || Socorro || LINEAR || — || align=right | 2.4 km || 
|-id=712 bgcolor=#E9E9E9
| 142712 ||  || — || October 10, 2002 || Socorro || LINEAR || — || align=right | 1.4 km || 
|-id=713 bgcolor=#E9E9E9
| 142713 ||  || — || October 10, 2002 || Socorro || LINEAR || — || align=right | 2.3 km || 
|-id=714 bgcolor=#E9E9E9
| 142714 ||  || — || October 10, 2002 || Socorro || LINEAR || — || align=right | 2.2 km || 
|-id=715 bgcolor=#E9E9E9
| 142715 ||  || — || October 10, 2002 || Socorro || LINEAR || EUN || align=right | 3.2 km || 
|-id=716 bgcolor=#E9E9E9
| 142716 ||  || — || October 10, 2002 || Socorro || LINEAR || — || align=right | 2.0 km || 
|-id=717 bgcolor=#E9E9E9
| 142717 ||  || — || October 9, 2002 || Socorro || LINEAR || — || align=right | 3.6 km || 
|-id=718 bgcolor=#E9E9E9
| 142718 ||  || — || October 9, 2002 || Socorro || LINEAR || — || align=right | 3.6 km || 
|-id=719 bgcolor=#E9E9E9
| 142719 ||  || — || October 9, 2002 || Socorro || LINEAR || — || align=right | 2.0 km || 
|-id=720 bgcolor=#E9E9E9
| 142720 ||  || — || October 10, 2002 || Palomar || NEAT || MRX || align=right | 1.3 km || 
|-id=721 bgcolor=#E9E9E9
| 142721 ||  || — || October 10, 2002 || Socorro || LINEAR || — || align=right | 3.3 km || 
|-id=722 bgcolor=#E9E9E9
| 142722 ||  || — || October 10, 2002 || Socorro || LINEAR || HNS || align=right | 1.9 km || 
|-id=723 bgcolor=#E9E9E9
| 142723 ||  || — || October 10, 2002 || Socorro || LINEAR || — || align=right | 3.5 km || 
|-id=724 bgcolor=#E9E9E9
| 142724 ||  || — || October 10, 2002 || Socorro || LINEAR || — || align=right | 3.1 km || 
|-id=725 bgcolor=#E9E9E9
| 142725 ||  || — || October 10, 2002 || Socorro || LINEAR || — || align=right | 3.3 km || 
|-id=726 bgcolor=#E9E9E9
| 142726 ||  || — || October 10, 2002 || Socorro || LINEAR || — || align=right | 2.0 km || 
|-id=727 bgcolor=#E9E9E9
| 142727 ||  || — || October 10, 2002 || Socorro || LINEAR || MAR || align=right | 2.7 km || 
|-id=728 bgcolor=#E9E9E9
| 142728 ||  || — || October 10, 2002 || Socorro || LINEAR || — || align=right | 4.2 km || 
|-id=729 bgcolor=#E9E9E9
| 142729 ||  || — || October 10, 2002 || Socorro || LINEAR || — || align=right | 2.6 km || 
|-id=730 bgcolor=#E9E9E9
| 142730 ||  || — || October 10, 2002 || Socorro || LINEAR || RAF || align=right | 2.1 km || 
|-id=731 bgcolor=#E9E9E9
| 142731 ||  || — || October 10, 2002 || Socorro || LINEAR || MAR || align=right | 2.3 km || 
|-id=732 bgcolor=#E9E9E9
| 142732 ||  || — || October 10, 2002 || Socorro || LINEAR || MAR || align=right | 1.8 km || 
|-id=733 bgcolor=#E9E9E9
| 142733 ||  || — || October 10, 2002 || Socorro || LINEAR || — || align=right | 2.1 km || 
|-id=734 bgcolor=#E9E9E9
| 142734 ||  || — || October 10, 2002 || Socorro || LINEAR || HNS || align=right | 2.0 km || 
|-id=735 bgcolor=#E9E9E9
| 142735 ||  || — || October 10, 2002 || Socorro || LINEAR || JUN || align=right | 2.1 km || 
|-id=736 bgcolor=#E9E9E9
| 142736 ||  || — || October 10, 2002 || Socorro || LINEAR || — || align=right | 2.4 km || 
|-id=737 bgcolor=#fefefe
| 142737 ||  || — || October 10, 2002 || Socorro || LINEAR || — || align=right | 2.2 km || 
|-id=738 bgcolor=#E9E9E9
| 142738 ||  || — || October 10, 2002 || Socorro || LINEAR || — || align=right | 6.3 km || 
|-id=739 bgcolor=#E9E9E9
| 142739 ||  || — || October 10, 2002 || Socorro || LINEAR || BRU || align=right | 5.8 km || 
|-id=740 bgcolor=#E9E9E9
| 142740 ||  || — || October 10, 2002 || Socorro || LINEAR || AGN || align=right | 2.3 km || 
|-id=741 bgcolor=#E9E9E9
| 142741 ||  || — || October 10, 2002 || Socorro || LINEAR || — || align=right | 1.4 km || 
|-id=742 bgcolor=#E9E9E9
| 142742 ||  || — || October 10, 2002 || Socorro || LINEAR || EUN || align=right | 2.5 km || 
|-id=743 bgcolor=#E9E9E9
| 142743 ||  || — || October 10, 2002 || Socorro || LINEAR || — || align=right | 1.7 km || 
|-id=744 bgcolor=#fefefe
| 142744 ||  || — || October 10, 2002 || Socorro || LINEAR || — || align=right | 2.0 km || 
|-id=745 bgcolor=#E9E9E9
| 142745 ||  || — || October 10, 2002 || Socorro || LINEAR || — || align=right | 3.7 km || 
|-id=746 bgcolor=#E9E9E9
| 142746 ||  || — || October 12, 2002 || Socorro || LINEAR || — || align=right | 2.7 km || 
|-id=747 bgcolor=#E9E9E9
| 142747 ||  || — || October 13, 2002 || Palomar || NEAT || — || align=right | 2.0 km || 
|-id=748 bgcolor=#E9E9E9
| 142748 ||  || — || October 13, 2002 || Palomar || NEAT || MIT || align=right | 4.8 km || 
|-id=749 bgcolor=#E9E9E9
| 142749 ||  || — || October 11, 2002 || Socorro || LINEAR || — || align=right | 1.7 km || 
|-id=750 bgcolor=#fefefe
| 142750 ||  || — || October 12, 2002 || Socorro || LINEAR || — || align=right | 1.5 km || 
|-id=751 bgcolor=#fefefe
| 142751 ||  || — || October 15, 2002 || Palomar || NEAT || CLA || align=right | 2.2 km || 
|-id=752 bgcolor=#E9E9E9
| 142752 Boroski ||  ||  || October 4, 2002 || Apache Point || SDSS || — || align=right | 1.8 km || 
|-id=753 bgcolor=#E9E9E9
| 142753 Briegel ||  ||  || October 4, 2002 || Apache Point || SDSS || MAR || align=right | 1.8 km || 
|-id=754 bgcolor=#E9E9E9
| 142754 Brunner ||  ||  || October 5, 2002 || Apache Point || SDSS || — || align=right | 1.4 km || 
|-id=755 bgcolor=#fefefe
| 142755 Castander ||  ||  || October 5, 2002 || Apache Point || SDSS || — || align=right | 1.5 km || 
|-id=756 bgcolor=#fefefe
| 142756 Chiu ||  ||  || October 5, 2002 || Apache Point || SDSS || — || align=right | 1.6 km || 
|-id=757 bgcolor=#E9E9E9
| 142757 Collinge ||  ||  || October 5, 2002 || Apache Point || SDSS || MAR || align=right | 1.4 km || 
|-id=758 bgcolor=#fefefe
| 142758 Connolly ||  ||  || October 10, 2002 || Apache Point || SDSS || MAS || align=right | 1.4 km || 
|-id=759 bgcolor=#fefefe
| 142759 Covey ||  ||  || October 10, 2002 || Apache Point || SDSS || MAS || align=right | 1.4 km || 
|-id=760 bgcolor=#E9E9E9
| 142760 Csabai ||  ||  || October 10, 2002 || Apache Point || SDSS || — || align=right | 1.4 km || 
|-id=761 bgcolor=#E9E9E9
| 142761 ||  || — || October 28, 2002 || Socorro || LINEAR || BAR || align=right | 2.2 km || 
|-id=762 bgcolor=#E9E9E9
| 142762 ||  || — || October 28, 2002 || Palomar || NEAT || — || align=right | 3.7 km || 
|-id=763 bgcolor=#fefefe
| 142763 ||  || — || October 29, 2002 || Palomar || NEAT || — || align=right | 1.7 km || 
|-id=764 bgcolor=#E9E9E9
| 142764 ||  || — || October 29, 2002 || Socorro || LINEAR || BAR || align=right | 1.8 km || 
|-id=765 bgcolor=#E9E9E9
| 142765 ||  || — || October 29, 2002 || Socorro || LINEAR || GAL || align=right | 2.6 km || 
|-id=766 bgcolor=#E9E9E9
| 142766 ||  || — || October 26, 2002 || Haleakala || NEAT || GEF || align=right | 1.8 km || 
|-id=767 bgcolor=#E9E9E9
| 142767 ||  || — || October 28, 2002 || Palomar || NEAT || — || align=right | 1.7 km || 
|-id=768 bgcolor=#E9E9E9
| 142768 ||  || — || October 28, 2002 || Palomar || NEAT || — || align=right | 4.8 km || 
|-id=769 bgcolor=#E9E9E9
| 142769 ||  || — || October 28, 2002 || Palomar || NEAT || — || align=right | 4.7 km || 
|-id=770 bgcolor=#E9E9E9
| 142770 ||  || — || October 28, 2002 || Palomar || NEAT || — || align=right | 4.7 km || 
|-id=771 bgcolor=#d6d6d6
| 142771 ||  || — || October 28, 2002 || Palomar || NEAT || — || align=right | 8.0 km || 
|-id=772 bgcolor=#E9E9E9
| 142772 ||  || — || October 28, 2002 || Palomar || NEAT || — || align=right | 3.0 km || 
|-id=773 bgcolor=#E9E9E9
| 142773 ||  || — || October 28, 2002 || Palomar || NEAT || — || align=right | 3.2 km || 
|-id=774 bgcolor=#E9E9E9
| 142774 ||  || — || October 28, 2002 || Palomar || NEAT || — || align=right | 2.6 km || 
|-id=775 bgcolor=#E9E9E9
| 142775 ||  || — || October 28, 2002 || Palomar || NEAT || JUN || align=right | 1.6 km || 
|-id=776 bgcolor=#E9E9E9
| 142776 ||  || — || October 28, 2002 || Palomar || NEAT || — || align=right | 3.0 km || 
|-id=777 bgcolor=#E9E9E9
| 142777 ||  || — || October 28, 2002 || Palomar || NEAT || — || align=right | 4.7 km || 
|-id=778 bgcolor=#E9E9E9
| 142778 ||  || — || October 28, 2002 || Palomar || NEAT || — || align=right | 3.2 km || 
|-id=779 bgcolor=#fefefe
| 142779 ||  || — || October 28, 2002 || Kitt Peak || Spacewatch || V || align=right | 1.3 km || 
|-id=780 bgcolor=#E9E9E9
| 142780 ||  || — || October 28, 2002 || Haleakala || NEAT || — || align=right | 2.7 km || 
|-id=781 bgcolor=#FFC2E0
| 142781 ||  || — || October 30, 2002 || Socorro || LINEAR || AMO +1km || align=right | 1.6 km || 
|-id=782 bgcolor=#E9E9E9
| 142782 ||  || — || October 29, 2002 || Goodricke-Pigott || Goodricke-Pigott Obs. || — || align=right | 2.1 km || 
|-id=783 bgcolor=#E9E9E9
| 142783 ||  || — || October 28, 2002 || Haleakala || NEAT || GEF || align=right | 2.1 km || 
|-id=784 bgcolor=#E9E9E9
| 142784 ||  || — || October 29, 2002 || Socorro || LINEAR || BRU || align=right | 7.9 km || 
|-id=785 bgcolor=#E9E9E9
| 142785 ||  || — || October 29, 2002 || Palomar || NEAT || — || align=right | 1.8 km || 
|-id=786 bgcolor=#E9E9E9
| 142786 ||  || — || October 30, 2002 || Socorro || LINEAR || MIT || align=right | 2.0 km || 
|-id=787 bgcolor=#E9E9E9
| 142787 ||  || — || October 30, 2002 || Socorro || LINEAR || — || align=right | 5.6 km || 
|-id=788 bgcolor=#E9E9E9
| 142788 ||  || — || October 30, 2002 || Palomar || NEAT || — || align=right | 2.1 km || 
|-id=789 bgcolor=#E9E9E9
| 142789 ||  || — || October 30, 2002 || Socorro || LINEAR || — || align=right | 2.1 km || 
|-id=790 bgcolor=#E9E9E9
| 142790 ||  || — || October 30, 2002 || Haleakala || NEAT || — || align=right | 4.0 km || 
|-id=791 bgcolor=#E9E9E9
| 142791 ||  || — || October 30, 2002 || Haleakala || NEAT || — || align=right | 3.7 km || 
|-id=792 bgcolor=#E9E9E9
| 142792 ||  || — || October 30, 2002 || Haleakala || NEAT || — || align=right | 3.1 km || 
|-id=793 bgcolor=#E9E9E9
| 142793 ||  || — || October 30, 2002 || Haleakala || NEAT || — || align=right | 5.9 km || 
|-id=794 bgcolor=#fefefe
| 142794 ||  || — || October 28, 2002 || Kitt Peak || Spacewatch || NYS || align=right | 1.2 km || 
|-id=795 bgcolor=#E9E9E9
| 142795 ||  || — || October 28, 2002 || Palomar || NEAT || — || align=right | 5.7 km || 
|-id=796 bgcolor=#E9E9E9
| 142796 ||  || — || October 28, 2002 || Palomar || NEAT || NEM || align=right | 4.3 km || 
|-id=797 bgcolor=#E9E9E9
| 142797 ||  || — || October 28, 2002 || Haleakala || NEAT || — || align=right | 2.7 km || 
|-id=798 bgcolor=#E9E9E9
| 142798 ||  || — || October 28, 2002 || Haleakala || NEAT || AER || align=right | 2.4 km || 
|-id=799 bgcolor=#E9E9E9
| 142799 ||  || — || October 30, 2002 || Haleakala || NEAT || — || align=right | 2.2 km || 
|-id=800 bgcolor=#E9E9E9
| 142800 ||  || — || October 28, 2002 || Palomar || NEAT || — || align=right | 2.1 km || 
|}

142801–142900 

|-bgcolor=#E9E9E9
| 142801 ||  || — || October 31, 2002 || Socorro || LINEAR || — || align=right | 2.4 km || 
|-id=802 bgcolor=#E9E9E9
| 142802 ||  || — || October 31, 2002 || Palomar || NEAT || — || align=right | 2.0 km || 
|-id=803 bgcolor=#FA8072
| 142803 ||  || — || October 31, 2002 || Palomar || NEAT || — || align=right | 1.6 km || 
|-id=804 bgcolor=#E9E9E9
| 142804 ||  || — || October 31, 2002 || Palomar || NEAT || — || align=right | 3.9 km || 
|-id=805 bgcolor=#E9E9E9
| 142805 ||  || — || October 31, 2002 || Socorro || LINEAR || — || align=right | 2.2 km || 
|-id=806 bgcolor=#E9E9E9
| 142806 ||  || — || October 31, 2002 || Socorro || LINEAR || — || align=right | 3.8 km || 
|-id=807 bgcolor=#E9E9E9
| 142807 ||  || — || October 30, 2002 || Haleakala || NEAT || — || align=right | 2.9 km || 
|-id=808 bgcolor=#fefefe
| 142808 ||  || — || October 31, 2002 || Anderson Mesa || LONEOS || — || align=right | 1.4 km || 
|-id=809 bgcolor=#E9E9E9
| 142809 ||  || — || October 31, 2002 || Anderson Mesa || LONEOS || AGN || align=right | 2.0 km || 
|-id=810 bgcolor=#E9E9E9
| 142810 ||  || — || October 31, 2002 || Socorro || LINEAR || MAR || align=right | 2.2 km || 
|-id=811 bgcolor=#E9E9E9
| 142811 ||  || — || October 31, 2002 || Kvistaberg || UDAS || — || align=right | 2.1 km || 
|-id=812 bgcolor=#E9E9E9
| 142812 ||  || — || October 31, 2002 || Anderson Mesa || LONEOS || — || align=right | 2.9 km || 
|-id=813 bgcolor=#E9E9E9
| 142813 ||  || — || October 31, 2002 || Anderson Mesa || LONEOS || — || align=right | 1.4 km || 
|-id=814 bgcolor=#fefefe
| 142814 ||  || — || October 31, 2002 || Palomar || NEAT || MAS || align=right | 1.1 km || 
|-id=815 bgcolor=#E9E9E9
| 142815 ||  || — || October 31, 2002 || Palomar || NEAT || — || align=right | 3.2 km || 
|-id=816 bgcolor=#E9E9E9
| 142816 ||  || — || October 31, 2002 || Socorro || LINEAR || — || align=right | 3.2 km || 
|-id=817 bgcolor=#E9E9E9
| 142817 ||  || — || October 31, 2002 || Socorro || LINEAR || — || align=right | 2.2 km || 
|-id=818 bgcolor=#E9E9E9
| 142818 ||  || — || October 31, 2002 || Socorro || LINEAR || — || align=right | 1.7 km || 
|-id=819 bgcolor=#E9E9E9
| 142819 ||  || — || October 31, 2002 || Socorro || LINEAR || — || align=right | 2.8 km || 
|-id=820 bgcolor=#E9E9E9
| 142820 ||  || — || October 31, 2002 || Socorro || LINEAR || — || align=right | 3.4 km || 
|-id=821 bgcolor=#E9E9E9
| 142821 ||  || — || October 31, 2002 || Socorro || LINEAR || — || align=right | 4.8 km || 
|-id=822 bgcolor=#fefefe
| 142822 Czarapata ||  ||  || October 30, 2002 || Apache Point || SDSS || MAS || align=right | 1.3 km || 
|-id=823 bgcolor=#E9E9E9
| 142823 ||  || — || November 1, 2002 || Palomar || NEAT || — || align=right | 3.7 km || 
|-id=824 bgcolor=#E9E9E9
| 142824 ||  || — || November 2, 2002 || Haleakala || NEAT || — || align=right | 4.1 km || 
|-id=825 bgcolor=#E9E9E9
| 142825 ||  || — || November 1, 2002 || Palomar || NEAT || — || align=right | 3.9 km || 
|-id=826 bgcolor=#E9E9E9
| 142826 ||  || — || November 1, 2002 || Palomar || NEAT || — || align=right | 1.9 km || 
|-id=827 bgcolor=#E9E9E9
| 142827 ||  || — || November 1, 2002 || Palomar || NEAT || — || align=right | 4.0 km || 
|-id=828 bgcolor=#E9E9E9
| 142828 ||  || — || November 1, 2002 || Palomar || NEAT || — || align=right | 4.0 km || 
|-id=829 bgcolor=#E9E9E9
| 142829 ||  || — || November 1, 2002 || Palomar || NEAT || — || align=right | 1.8 km || 
|-id=830 bgcolor=#E9E9E9
| 142830 ||  || — || November 1, 2002 || Palomar || NEAT || — || align=right | 2.7 km || 
|-id=831 bgcolor=#fefefe
| 142831 ||  || — || November 1, 2002 || Palomar || NEAT || V || align=right | 1.4 km || 
|-id=832 bgcolor=#E9E9E9
| 142832 ||  || — || November 1, 2002 || Haleakala || NEAT || WIT || align=right | 1.9 km || 
|-id=833 bgcolor=#E9E9E9
| 142833 ||  || — || November 2, 2002 || Kvistaberg || UDAS || — || align=right | 1.9 km || 
|-id=834 bgcolor=#E9E9E9
| 142834 ||  || — || November 2, 2002 || Kvistaberg || UDAS || — || align=right | 4.2 km || 
|-id=835 bgcolor=#E9E9E9
| 142835 ||  || — || November 4, 2002 || Anderson Mesa || LONEOS || MRX || align=right | 1.9 km || 
|-id=836 bgcolor=#E9E9E9
| 142836 ||  || — || November 4, 2002 || Anderson Mesa || LONEOS || EUN || align=right | 2.9 km || 
|-id=837 bgcolor=#E9E9E9
| 142837 ||  || — || November 4, 2002 || Palomar || NEAT || — || align=right | 2.6 km || 
|-id=838 bgcolor=#E9E9E9
| 142838 ||  || — || November 4, 2002 || Anderson Mesa || LONEOS || — || align=right | 4.1 km || 
|-id=839 bgcolor=#E9E9E9
| 142839 ||  || — || November 5, 2002 || Socorro || LINEAR || — || align=right | 2.3 km || 
|-id=840 bgcolor=#E9E9E9
| 142840 ||  || — || November 5, 2002 || Socorro || LINEAR || — || align=right | 1.8 km || 
|-id=841 bgcolor=#E9E9E9
| 142841 ||  || — || November 2, 2002 || Anderson Mesa || LONEOS || — || align=right | 3.2 km || 
|-id=842 bgcolor=#fefefe
| 142842 ||  || — || November 2, 2002 || Haleakala || NEAT || NYS || align=right | 1.0 km || 
|-id=843 bgcolor=#E9E9E9
| 142843 ||  || — || November 4, 2002 || Anderson Mesa || LONEOS || — || align=right | 1.8 km || 
|-id=844 bgcolor=#fefefe
| 142844 ||  || — || November 5, 2002 || Socorro || LINEAR || — || align=right | 2.4 km || 
|-id=845 bgcolor=#E9E9E9
| 142845 ||  || — || November 5, 2002 || Socorro || LINEAR || — || align=right | 4.6 km || 
|-id=846 bgcolor=#E9E9E9
| 142846 ||  || — || November 5, 2002 || Socorro || LINEAR || — || align=right | 2.3 km || 
|-id=847 bgcolor=#E9E9E9
| 142847 ||  || — || November 5, 2002 || Socorro || LINEAR || — || align=right | 2.4 km || 
|-id=848 bgcolor=#E9E9E9
| 142848 ||  || — || November 5, 2002 || Socorro || LINEAR || — || align=right | 1.6 km || 
|-id=849 bgcolor=#E9E9E9
| 142849 ||  || — || November 5, 2002 || Socorro || LINEAR || — || align=right | 2.6 km || 
|-id=850 bgcolor=#fefefe
| 142850 ||  || — || November 5, 2002 || Socorro || LINEAR || — || align=right | 1.2 km || 
|-id=851 bgcolor=#E9E9E9
| 142851 ||  || — || November 5, 2002 || Socorro || LINEAR || — || align=right | 3.9 km || 
|-id=852 bgcolor=#E9E9E9
| 142852 ||  || — || November 5, 2002 || Socorro || LINEAR || — || align=right | 1.6 km || 
|-id=853 bgcolor=#E9E9E9
| 142853 ||  || — || November 5, 2002 || Socorro || LINEAR || — || align=right | 3.7 km || 
|-id=854 bgcolor=#E9E9E9
| 142854 ||  || — || November 5, 2002 || Socorro || LINEAR || — || align=right | 2.1 km || 
|-id=855 bgcolor=#E9E9E9
| 142855 ||  || — || November 5, 2002 || Socorro || LINEAR || HOF || align=right | 4.2 km || 
|-id=856 bgcolor=#E9E9E9
| 142856 ||  || — || November 5, 2002 || Socorro || LINEAR || — || align=right | 2.1 km || 
|-id=857 bgcolor=#E9E9E9
| 142857 ||  || — || November 5, 2002 || Socorro || LINEAR || NEM || align=right | 3.9 km || 
|-id=858 bgcolor=#E9E9E9
| 142858 ||  || — || November 5, 2002 || Anderson Mesa || LONEOS || — || align=right | 3.2 km || 
|-id=859 bgcolor=#E9E9E9
| 142859 ||  || — || November 5, 2002 || Anderson Mesa || LONEOS || HEN || align=right | 2.3 km || 
|-id=860 bgcolor=#E9E9E9
| 142860 ||  || — || November 5, 2002 || Anderson Mesa || LONEOS || — || align=right | 1.6 km || 
|-id=861 bgcolor=#fefefe
| 142861 ||  || — || November 5, 2002 || Anderson Mesa || LONEOS || MAS || align=right | 1.3 km || 
|-id=862 bgcolor=#E9E9E9
| 142862 ||  || — || November 5, 2002 || Anderson Mesa || LONEOS || — || align=right | 2.2 km || 
|-id=863 bgcolor=#fefefe
| 142863 ||  || — || November 5, 2002 || Anderson Mesa || LONEOS || — || align=right | 1.7 km || 
|-id=864 bgcolor=#E9E9E9
| 142864 ||  || — || November 5, 2002 || Socorro || LINEAR || — || align=right | 2.0 km || 
|-id=865 bgcolor=#E9E9E9
| 142865 ||  || — || November 5, 2002 || Socorro || LINEAR || — || align=right | 3.1 km || 
|-id=866 bgcolor=#E9E9E9
| 142866 ||  || — || November 5, 2002 || Socorro || LINEAR || NEM || align=right | 3.9 km || 
|-id=867 bgcolor=#E9E9E9
| 142867 ||  || — || November 5, 2002 || Socorro || LINEAR || AGN || align=right | 2.3 km || 
|-id=868 bgcolor=#E9E9E9
| 142868 ||  || — || November 5, 2002 || Socorro || LINEAR || — || align=right | 1.9 km || 
|-id=869 bgcolor=#E9E9E9
| 142869 ||  || — || November 5, 2002 || Socorro || LINEAR || — || align=right | 2.2 km || 
|-id=870 bgcolor=#fefefe
| 142870 ||  || — || November 5, 2002 || Socorro || LINEAR || MAS || align=right | 1.4 km || 
|-id=871 bgcolor=#E9E9E9
| 142871 ||  || — || November 5, 2002 || Socorro || LINEAR || NEM || align=right | 3.1 km || 
|-id=872 bgcolor=#E9E9E9
| 142872 ||  || — || November 5, 2002 || Socorro || LINEAR || RAF || align=right | 2.0 km || 
|-id=873 bgcolor=#E9E9E9
| 142873 ||  || — || November 5, 2002 || Socorro || LINEAR || — || align=right | 1.3 km || 
|-id=874 bgcolor=#E9E9E9
| 142874 ||  || — || November 5, 2002 || Socorro || LINEAR || — || align=right | 4.2 km || 
|-id=875 bgcolor=#E9E9E9
| 142875 ||  || — || November 5, 2002 || Socorro || LINEAR || MIT || align=right | 3.9 km || 
|-id=876 bgcolor=#E9E9E9
| 142876 ||  || — || November 5, 2002 || Socorro || LINEAR || MRX || align=right | 2.0 km || 
|-id=877 bgcolor=#E9E9E9
| 142877 ||  || — || November 5, 2002 || Socorro || LINEAR || — || align=right | 2.8 km || 
|-id=878 bgcolor=#E9E9E9
| 142878 ||  || — || November 4, 2002 || Haleakala || NEAT || — || align=right | 4.6 km || 
|-id=879 bgcolor=#fefefe
| 142879 ||  || — || November 5, 2002 || Socorro || LINEAR || V || align=right | 1.3 km || 
|-id=880 bgcolor=#E9E9E9
| 142880 ||  || — || November 5, 2002 || Socorro || LINEAR || — || align=right | 4.1 km || 
|-id=881 bgcolor=#E9E9E9
| 142881 ||  || — || November 5, 2002 || Socorro || LINEAR || — || align=right | 2.4 km || 
|-id=882 bgcolor=#E9E9E9
| 142882 ||  || — || November 2, 2002 || Haleakala || NEAT || — || align=right | 2.6 km || 
|-id=883 bgcolor=#E9E9E9
| 142883 ||  || — || November 5, 2002 || Palomar || NEAT || PAD || align=right | 2.9 km || 
|-id=884 bgcolor=#fefefe
| 142884 ||  || — || November 5, 2002 || Palomar || NEAT || — || align=right | 1.6 km || 
|-id=885 bgcolor=#fefefe
| 142885 ||  || — || November 3, 2002 || Haleakala || NEAT || — || align=right | 1.5 km || 
|-id=886 bgcolor=#E9E9E9
| 142886 ||  || — || November 4, 2002 || Palomar || NEAT || — || align=right | 4.3 km || 
|-id=887 bgcolor=#E9E9E9
| 142887 ||  || — || November 4, 2002 || Palomar || NEAT || — || align=right | 1.7 km || 
|-id=888 bgcolor=#E9E9E9
| 142888 ||  || — || November 4, 2002 || Palomar || NEAT || — || align=right | 4.3 km || 
|-id=889 bgcolor=#E9E9E9
| 142889 ||  || — || November 5, 2002 || Socorro || LINEAR || — || align=right | 3.4 km || 
|-id=890 bgcolor=#E9E9E9
| 142890 ||  || — || November 5, 2002 || Socorro || LINEAR || — || align=right | 3.6 km || 
|-id=891 bgcolor=#E9E9E9
| 142891 ||  || — || November 5, 2002 || Palomar || NEAT || — || align=right | 3.2 km || 
|-id=892 bgcolor=#fefefe
| 142892 ||  || — || November 5, 2002 || Socorro || LINEAR || — || align=right | 1.1 km || 
|-id=893 bgcolor=#E9E9E9
| 142893 ||  || — || November 5, 2002 || Socorro || LINEAR || MIS || align=right | 3.3 km || 
|-id=894 bgcolor=#E9E9E9
| 142894 ||  || — || November 5, 2002 || Palomar || NEAT || — || align=right | 1.8 km || 
|-id=895 bgcolor=#E9E9E9
| 142895 ||  || — || November 5, 2002 || Palomar || NEAT || — || align=right | 3.9 km || 
|-id=896 bgcolor=#E9E9E9
| 142896 ||  || — || November 5, 2002 || Anderson Mesa || LONEOS || HNS || align=right | 1.9 km || 
|-id=897 bgcolor=#E9E9E9
| 142897 ||  || — || November 5, 2002 || Socorro || LINEAR || — || align=right | 3.7 km || 
|-id=898 bgcolor=#E9E9E9
| 142898 ||  || — || November 5, 2002 || Socorro || LINEAR || EUN || align=right | 3.1 km || 
|-id=899 bgcolor=#E9E9E9
| 142899 ||  || — || November 5, 2002 || Socorro || LINEAR || — || align=right | 2.9 km || 
|-id=900 bgcolor=#E9E9E9
| 142900 ||  || — || November 5, 2002 || Socorro || LINEAR || — || align=right | 4.7 km || 
|}

142901–143000 

|-bgcolor=#E9E9E9
| 142901 ||  || — || November 5, 2002 || Anderson Mesa || LONEOS || AGN || align=right | 2.2 km || 
|-id=902 bgcolor=#E9E9E9
| 142902 ||  || — || November 5, 2002 || Anderson Mesa || LONEOS || — || align=right | 3.9 km || 
|-id=903 bgcolor=#E9E9E9
| 142903 ||  || — || November 5, 2002 || Anderson Mesa || LONEOS || — || align=right | 1.4 km || 
|-id=904 bgcolor=#E9E9E9
| 142904 ||  || — || November 5, 2002 || Anderson Mesa || LONEOS || — || align=right | 2.1 km || 
|-id=905 bgcolor=#fefefe
| 142905 ||  || — || November 5, 2002 || Anderson Mesa || LONEOS || NYS || align=right | 1.4 km || 
|-id=906 bgcolor=#E9E9E9
| 142906 ||  || — || November 6, 2002 || Anderson Mesa || LONEOS || — || align=right | 2.0 km || 
|-id=907 bgcolor=#E9E9E9
| 142907 ||  || — || November 6, 2002 || Anderson Mesa || LONEOS || — || align=right | 5.0 km || 
|-id=908 bgcolor=#E9E9E9
| 142908 ||  || — || November 6, 2002 || Anderson Mesa || LONEOS || — || align=right | 2.9 km || 
|-id=909 bgcolor=#E9E9E9
| 142909 ||  || — || November 6, 2002 || Anderson Mesa || LONEOS || — || align=right | 2.2 km || 
|-id=910 bgcolor=#E9E9E9
| 142910 ||  || — || November 6, 2002 || Socorro || LINEAR || HEN || align=right | 2.1 km || 
|-id=911 bgcolor=#fefefe
| 142911 ||  || — || November 6, 2002 || Socorro || LINEAR || V || align=right | 1.5 km || 
|-id=912 bgcolor=#E9E9E9
| 142912 ||  || — || November 6, 2002 || Anderson Mesa || LONEOS || JUN || align=right | 1.8 km || 
|-id=913 bgcolor=#E9E9E9
| 142913 ||  || — || November 6, 2002 || Socorro || LINEAR || — || align=right | 1.7 km || 
|-id=914 bgcolor=#E9E9E9
| 142914 ||  || — || November 6, 2002 || Socorro || LINEAR || — || align=right | 6.6 km || 
|-id=915 bgcolor=#E9E9E9
| 142915 ||  || — || November 6, 2002 || Anderson Mesa || LONEOS || — || align=right | 4.4 km || 
|-id=916 bgcolor=#E9E9E9
| 142916 ||  || — || November 6, 2002 || Anderson Mesa || LONEOS || — || align=right | 2.1 km || 
|-id=917 bgcolor=#E9E9E9
| 142917 ||  || — || November 6, 2002 || Anderson Mesa || LONEOS || — || align=right | 4.3 km || 
|-id=918 bgcolor=#E9E9E9
| 142918 ||  || — || November 6, 2002 || Socorro || LINEAR || — || align=right | 2.5 km || 
|-id=919 bgcolor=#E9E9E9
| 142919 ||  || — || November 6, 2002 || Kitt Peak || Spacewatch || — || align=right | 2.9 km || 
|-id=920 bgcolor=#E9E9E9
| 142920 ||  || — || November 6, 2002 || Haleakala || NEAT || EUN || align=right | 2.2 km || 
|-id=921 bgcolor=#E9E9E9
| 142921 ||  || — || November 6, 2002 || Haleakala || NEAT || — || align=right | 1.5 km || 
|-id=922 bgcolor=#E9E9E9
| 142922 ||  || — || November 6, 2002 || Haleakala || NEAT || — || align=right | 4.3 km || 
|-id=923 bgcolor=#E9E9E9
| 142923 ||  || — || November 6, 2002 || Haleakala || NEAT || — || align=right | 4.4 km || 
|-id=924 bgcolor=#E9E9E9
| 142924 ||  || — || November 6, 2002 || Haleakala || NEAT || — || align=right | 2.5 km || 
|-id=925 bgcolor=#E9E9E9
| 142925 ||  || — || November 6, 2002 || Haleakala || NEAT || — || align=right | 2.2 km || 
|-id=926 bgcolor=#E9E9E9
| 142926 ||  || — || November 3, 2002 || Haleakala || NEAT || — || align=right | 2.1 km || 
|-id=927 bgcolor=#fefefe
| 142927 ||  || — || November 3, 2002 || Haleakala || NEAT || — || align=right | 1.3 km || 
|-id=928 bgcolor=#E9E9E9
| 142928 ||  || — || November 3, 2002 || Haleakala || NEAT || — || align=right | 2.6 km || 
|-id=929 bgcolor=#E9E9E9
| 142929 ||  || — || November 5, 2002 || Socorro || LINEAR || — || align=right | 2.0 km || 
|-id=930 bgcolor=#E9E9E9
| 142930 ||  || — || November 6, 2002 || Anderson Mesa || LONEOS || — || align=right | 3.7 km || 
|-id=931 bgcolor=#E9E9E9
| 142931 ||  || — || November 6, 2002 || Anderson Mesa || LONEOS || — || align=right | 3.2 km || 
|-id=932 bgcolor=#fefefe
| 142932 ||  || — || November 6, 2002 || Socorro || LINEAR || — || align=right | 1.4 km || 
|-id=933 bgcolor=#E9E9E9
| 142933 ||  || — || November 7, 2002 || Socorro || LINEAR || — || align=right | 2.3 km || 
|-id=934 bgcolor=#E9E9E9
| 142934 ||  || — || November 7, 2002 || Socorro || LINEAR || — || align=right | 2.7 km || 
|-id=935 bgcolor=#fefefe
| 142935 ||  || — || November 6, 2002 || Socorro || LINEAR || — || align=right | 1.6 km || 
|-id=936 bgcolor=#E9E9E9
| 142936 ||  || — || November 6, 2002 || Socorro || LINEAR || — || align=right | 1.4 km || 
|-id=937 bgcolor=#E9E9E9
| 142937 ||  || — || November 7, 2002 || Kitt Peak || Spacewatch || RAF || align=right | 1.7 km || 
|-id=938 bgcolor=#E9E9E9
| 142938 ||  || — || November 7, 2002 || Socorro || LINEAR || — || align=right | 2.0 km || 
|-id=939 bgcolor=#E9E9E9
| 142939 ||  || — || November 7, 2002 || Socorro || LINEAR || EUN || align=right | 2.2 km || 
|-id=940 bgcolor=#E9E9E9
| 142940 ||  || — || November 7, 2002 || Anderson Mesa || LONEOS || — || align=right | 6.5 km || 
|-id=941 bgcolor=#E9E9E9
| 142941 ||  || — || November 8, 2002 || Socorro || LINEAR || — || align=right | 1.7 km || 
|-id=942 bgcolor=#E9E9E9
| 142942 ||  || — || November 8, 2002 || Socorro || LINEAR || — || align=right | 2.5 km || 
|-id=943 bgcolor=#E9E9E9
| 142943 ||  || — || November 8, 2002 || Socorro || LINEAR || — || align=right | 3.1 km || 
|-id=944 bgcolor=#FA8072
| 142944 ||  || — || November 7, 2002 || Socorro || LINEAR || — || align=right | 2.8 km || 
|-id=945 bgcolor=#fefefe
| 142945 ||  || — || November 7, 2002 || Socorro || LINEAR || — || align=right | 1.4 km || 
|-id=946 bgcolor=#fefefe
| 142946 ||  || — || November 7, 2002 || Socorro || LINEAR || NYS || align=right | 1.3 km || 
|-id=947 bgcolor=#E9E9E9
| 142947 ||  || — || November 7, 2002 || Socorro || LINEAR || — || align=right | 2.8 km || 
|-id=948 bgcolor=#E9E9E9
| 142948 ||  || — || November 7, 2002 || Socorro || LINEAR || — || align=right | 1.5 km || 
|-id=949 bgcolor=#E9E9E9
| 142949 ||  || — || November 7, 2002 || Socorro || LINEAR || — || align=right | 1.9 km || 
|-id=950 bgcolor=#E9E9E9
| 142950 ||  || — || November 7, 2002 || Socorro || LINEAR || — || align=right | 4.1 km || 
|-id=951 bgcolor=#E9E9E9
| 142951 ||  || — || November 7, 2002 || Socorro || LINEAR || — || align=right | 2.6 km || 
|-id=952 bgcolor=#E9E9E9
| 142952 ||  || — || November 7, 2002 || Socorro || LINEAR || — || align=right | 1.4 km || 
|-id=953 bgcolor=#E9E9E9
| 142953 ||  || — || November 7, 2002 || Socorro || LINEAR || — || align=right | 3.8 km || 
|-id=954 bgcolor=#fefefe
| 142954 ||  || — || November 7, 2002 || Socorro || LINEAR || — || align=right | 1.6 km || 
|-id=955 bgcolor=#E9E9E9
| 142955 ||  || — || November 7, 2002 || Socorro || LINEAR || — || align=right | 1.9 km || 
|-id=956 bgcolor=#E9E9E9
| 142956 ||  || — || November 7, 2002 || Socorro || LINEAR || — || align=right | 2.7 km || 
|-id=957 bgcolor=#E9E9E9
| 142957 ||  || — || November 7, 2002 || Socorro || LINEAR || — || align=right | 1.6 km || 
|-id=958 bgcolor=#E9E9E9
| 142958 ||  || — || November 7, 2002 || Socorro || LINEAR || — || align=right | 3.5 km || 
|-id=959 bgcolor=#E9E9E9
| 142959 ||  || — || November 7, 2002 || Socorro || LINEAR || — || align=right | 3.0 km || 
|-id=960 bgcolor=#E9E9E9
| 142960 ||  || — || November 7, 2002 || Socorro || LINEAR || — || align=right | 3.9 km || 
|-id=961 bgcolor=#E9E9E9
| 142961 ||  || — || November 7, 2002 || Socorro || LINEAR || POS || align=right | 5.7 km || 
|-id=962 bgcolor=#E9E9E9
| 142962 ||  || — || November 7, 2002 || Socorro || LINEAR || — || align=right | 4.0 km || 
|-id=963 bgcolor=#E9E9E9
| 142963 ||  || — || November 7, 2002 || Socorro || LINEAR || — || align=right | 2.0 km || 
|-id=964 bgcolor=#fefefe
| 142964 ||  || — || November 7, 2002 || Socorro || LINEAR || — || align=right | 2.3 km || 
|-id=965 bgcolor=#E9E9E9
| 142965 ||  || — || November 7, 2002 || Socorro || LINEAR || — || align=right | 5.2 km || 
|-id=966 bgcolor=#E9E9E9
| 142966 ||  || — || November 7, 2002 || Socorro || LINEAR || — || align=right | 2.4 km || 
|-id=967 bgcolor=#E9E9E9
| 142967 ||  || — || November 7, 2002 || Socorro || LINEAR || — || align=right | 2.1 km || 
|-id=968 bgcolor=#fefefe
| 142968 ||  || — || November 7, 2002 || Socorro || LINEAR || FLO || align=right | 1.2 km || 
|-id=969 bgcolor=#E9E9E9
| 142969 ||  || — || November 7, 2002 || Socorro || LINEAR || — || align=right | 1.6 km || 
|-id=970 bgcolor=#E9E9E9
| 142970 ||  || — || November 7, 2002 || Socorro || LINEAR || — || align=right | 4.1 km || 
|-id=971 bgcolor=#E9E9E9
| 142971 ||  || — || November 7, 2002 || Socorro || LINEAR || — || align=right | 4.2 km || 
|-id=972 bgcolor=#E9E9E9
| 142972 ||  || — || November 7, 2002 || Socorro || LINEAR || — || align=right | 1.8 km || 
|-id=973 bgcolor=#fefefe
| 142973 ||  || — || November 7, 2002 || Socorro || LINEAR || — || align=right | 1.7 km || 
|-id=974 bgcolor=#fefefe
| 142974 ||  || — || November 7, 2002 || Socorro || LINEAR || V || align=right | 1.2 km || 
|-id=975 bgcolor=#E9E9E9
| 142975 ||  || — || November 7, 2002 || Socorro || LINEAR || — || align=right | 5.7 km || 
|-id=976 bgcolor=#E9E9E9
| 142976 ||  || — || November 7, 2002 || Socorro || LINEAR || — || align=right | 4.4 km || 
|-id=977 bgcolor=#E9E9E9
| 142977 ||  || — || November 7, 2002 || Socorro || LINEAR || — || align=right | 2.0 km || 
|-id=978 bgcolor=#E9E9E9
| 142978 ||  || — || November 7, 2002 || Socorro || LINEAR || — || align=right | 2.5 km || 
|-id=979 bgcolor=#E9E9E9
| 142979 ||  || — || November 7, 2002 || Socorro || LINEAR || — || align=right | 5.4 km || 
|-id=980 bgcolor=#fefefe
| 142980 ||  || — || November 8, 2002 || Socorro || LINEAR || V || align=right | 1.2 km || 
|-id=981 bgcolor=#E9E9E9
| 142981 ||  || — || November 8, 2002 || Socorro || LINEAR || — || align=right | 5.9 km || 
|-id=982 bgcolor=#E9E9E9
| 142982 ||  || — || November 8, 2002 || Socorro || LINEAR || PAD || align=right | 4.5 km || 
|-id=983 bgcolor=#E9E9E9
| 142983 ||  || — || November 8, 2002 || Socorro || LINEAR || — || align=right | 1.6 km || 
|-id=984 bgcolor=#fefefe
| 142984 ||  || — || November 8, 2002 || Socorro || LINEAR || — || align=right | 1.4 km || 
|-id=985 bgcolor=#fefefe
| 142985 ||  || — || November 10, 2002 || Socorro || LINEAR || — || align=right | 1.7 km || 
|-id=986 bgcolor=#E9E9E9
| 142986 ||  || — || November 11, 2002 || Socorro || LINEAR || — || align=right | 5.6 km || 
|-id=987 bgcolor=#E9E9E9
| 142987 ||  || — || November 11, 2002 || Socorro || LINEAR || — || align=right | 3.0 km || 
|-id=988 bgcolor=#d6d6d6
| 142988 ||  || — || November 11, 2002 || Socorro || LINEAR || KAR || align=right | 2.0 km || 
|-id=989 bgcolor=#FA8072
| 142989 ||  || — || November 11, 2002 || Anderson Mesa || LONEOS || — || align=right | 1.6 km || 
|-id=990 bgcolor=#E9E9E9
| 142990 ||  || — || November 11, 2002 || Socorro || LINEAR || — || align=right | 3.2 km || 
|-id=991 bgcolor=#E9E9E9
| 142991 ||  || — || November 11, 2002 || Socorro || LINEAR || — || align=right | 1.6 km || 
|-id=992 bgcolor=#E9E9E9
| 142992 ||  || — || November 12, 2002 || Socorro || LINEAR || — || align=right | 1.7 km || 
|-id=993 bgcolor=#E9E9E9
| 142993 ||  || — || November 12, 2002 || Socorro || LINEAR || — || align=right | 4.4 km || 
|-id=994 bgcolor=#E9E9E9
| 142994 ||  || — || November 12, 2002 || Socorro || LINEAR || — || align=right | 2.5 km || 
|-id=995 bgcolor=#E9E9E9
| 142995 ||  || — || November 12, 2002 || Socorro || LINEAR || — || align=right | 1.9 km || 
|-id=996 bgcolor=#E9E9E9
| 142996 ||  || — || November 11, 2002 || Anderson Mesa || LONEOS || RAF || align=right | 2.6 km || 
|-id=997 bgcolor=#E9E9E9
| 142997 ||  || — || November 11, 2002 || Socorro || LINEAR || — || align=right | 2.7 km || 
|-id=998 bgcolor=#E9E9E9
| 142998 ||  || — || November 12, 2002 || Socorro || LINEAR || WIT || align=right | 1.7 km || 
|-id=999 bgcolor=#E9E9E9
| 142999 ||  || — || November 13, 2002 || Socorro || LINEAR || BRU || align=right | 8.2 km || 
|-id=000 bgcolor=#E9E9E9
| 143000 ||  || — || November 11, 2002 || Socorro || LINEAR || — || align=right | 2.4 km || 
|}

References

External links 
 Discovery Circumstances: Numbered Minor Planets (140001)–(145000) (IAU Minor Planet Center)

0142